

18001–18100 

|-bgcolor=#E9E9E9
| 18001 ||  || — || May 12, 1999 || Socorro || LINEAR || — || align=right | 11 km || 
|-id=002 bgcolor=#E9E9E9
| 18002 ||  || — || May 12, 1999 || Socorro || LINEAR || — || align=right | 5.1 km || 
|-id=003 bgcolor=#E9E9E9
| 18003 ||  || — || May 13, 1999 || Socorro || LINEAR || — || align=right | 4.4 km || 
|-id=004 bgcolor=#fefefe
| 18004 Krystosek ||  ||  || May 12, 1999 || Socorro || LINEAR || FLO || align=right | 3.4 km || 
|-id=005 bgcolor=#fefefe
| 18005 ||  || — || May 12, 1999 || Socorro || LINEAR || CHL || align=right | 6.9 km || 
|-id=006 bgcolor=#d6d6d6
| 18006 ||  || — || May 12, 1999 || Socorro || LINEAR || — || align=right | 11 km || 
|-id=007 bgcolor=#E9E9E9
| 18007 ||  || — || May 12, 1999 || Socorro || LINEAR || ADE || align=right | 5.2 km || 
|-id=008 bgcolor=#d6d6d6
| 18008 ||  || — || May 12, 1999 || Socorro || LINEAR || — || align=right | 6.0 km || 
|-id=009 bgcolor=#E9E9E9
| 18009 Patrickgeer ||  ||  || May 12, 1999 || Socorro || LINEAR || GEF || align=right | 4.6 km || 
|-id=010 bgcolor=#d6d6d6
| 18010 ||  || — || May 12, 1999 || Socorro || LINEAR || — || align=right | 5.5 km || 
|-id=011 bgcolor=#d6d6d6
| 18011 ||  || — || May 13, 1999 || Socorro || LINEAR || THM || align=right | 7.2 km || 
|-id=012 bgcolor=#fefefe
| 18012 Marsland ||  ||  || May 13, 1999 || Socorro || LINEAR || FLO || align=right | 3.9 km || 
|-id=013 bgcolor=#E9E9E9
| 18013 Shedletsky ||  ||  || May 13, 1999 || Socorro || LINEAR || — || align=right | 8.8 km || 
|-id=014 bgcolor=#d6d6d6
| 18014 ||  || — || May 13, 1999 || Socorro || LINEAR || — || align=right | 5.3 km || 
|-id=015 bgcolor=#fefefe
| 18015 Semenkovich ||  ||  || May 13, 1999 || Socorro || LINEAR || V || align=right | 2.5 km || 
|-id=016 bgcolor=#fefefe
| 18016 Grondahl ||  ||  || May 13, 1999 || Socorro || LINEAR || — || align=right | 7.0 km || 
|-id=017 bgcolor=#E9E9E9
| 18017 ||  || — || May 14, 1999 || Socorro || LINEAR || — || align=right | 7.1 km || 
|-id=018 bgcolor=#fefefe
| 18018 ||  || — || May 10, 1999 || Socorro || LINEAR || — || align=right | 3.3 km || 
|-id=019 bgcolor=#fefefe
| 18019 Dascoli ||  ||  || May 13, 1999 || Socorro || LINEAR || — || align=right | 2.3 km || 
|-id=020 bgcolor=#d6d6d6
| 18020 Amend ||  ||  || May 13, 1999 || Socorro || LINEAR || — || align=right | 7.3 km || 
|-id=021 bgcolor=#E9E9E9
| 18021 Waldman ||  ||  || May 13, 1999 || Socorro || LINEAR || — || align=right | 7.1 km || 
|-id=022 bgcolor=#E9E9E9
| 18022 Pepper ||  ||  || May 13, 1999 || Socorro || LINEAR || — || align=right | 8.2 km || 
|-id=023 bgcolor=#E9E9E9
| 18023 ||  || — || May 12, 1999 || Socorro || LINEAR || EUN || align=right | 4.7 km || 
|-id=024 bgcolor=#d6d6d6
| 18024 Dobson ||  ||  || May 20, 1999 || Oaxaca || J. M. Roe || — || align=right | 5.2 km || 
|-id=025 bgcolor=#E9E9E9
| 18025 ||  || — || May 18, 1999 || Kitt Peak || Spacewatch || — || align=right | 4.1 km || 
|-id=026 bgcolor=#fefefe
| 18026 Juliabaldwin ||  ||  || May 18, 1999 || Socorro || LINEAR || — || align=right | 2.4 km || 
|-id=027 bgcolor=#fefefe
| 18027 Gokcay ||  ||  || May 18, 1999 || Socorro || LINEAR || FLO || align=right | 3.3 km || 
|-id=028 bgcolor=#fefefe
| 18028 Ramchandani ||  ||  || May 18, 1999 || Socorro || LINEAR || FLO || align=right | 2.8 km || 
|-id=029 bgcolor=#fefefe
| 18029 ||  || — || May 21, 1999 || Socorro || LINEAR || — || align=right | 4.5 km || 
|-id=030 bgcolor=#E9E9E9
| 18030 ||  || — || June 8, 1999 || Socorro || LINEAR || EUN || align=right | 4.7 km || 
|-id=031 bgcolor=#E9E9E9
| 18031 ||  || — || June 9, 1999 || Socorro || LINEAR || EUN || align=right | 6.2 km || 
|-id=032 bgcolor=#d6d6d6
| 18032 Geiss ||  ||  || June 20, 1999 || Anderson Mesa || LONEOS || — || align=right | 11 km || 
|-id=033 bgcolor=#d6d6d6
| 18033 ||  || — || July 14, 1999 || Zeno || T. Stafford || EOS || align=right | 7.7 km || 
|-id=034 bgcolor=#d6d6d6
| 18034 ||  || — || July 13, 1999 || Socorro || LINEAR || — || align=right | 6.6 km || 
|-id=035 bgcolor=#E9E9E9
| 18035 ||  || — || July 13, 1999 || Socorro || LINEAR || — || align=right | 3.8 km || 
|-id=036 bgcolor=#d6d6d6
| 18036 ||  || — || July 14, 1999 || Socorro || LINEAR || SHU3:2 || align=right | 17 km || 
|-id=037 bgcolor=#C2FFFF
| 18037 ||  || — || July 14, 1999 || Socorro || LINEAR || L5 || align=right | 24 km || 
|-id=038 bgcolor=#d6d6d6
| 18038 ||  || — || July 13, 1999 || Socorro || LINEAR || — || align=right | 6.3 km || 
|-id=039 bgcolor=#d6d6d6
| 18039 ||  || — || July 13, 1999 || Socorro || LINEAR || EOS || align=right | 8.1 km || 
|-id=040 bgcolor=#E9E9E9
| 18040 ||  || — || July 13, 1999 || Socorro || LINEAR || EUN || align=right | 5.3 km || 
|-id=041 bgcolor=#d6d6d6
| 18041 ||  || — || September 7, 1999 || Socorro || LINEAR || — || align=right | 15 km || 
|-id=042 bgcolor=#E9E9E9
| 18042 ||  || — || September 7, 1999 || Socorro || LINEAR || — || align=right | 7.6 km || 
|-id=043 bgcolor=#d6d6d6
| 18043 Laszkowska ||  ||  || September 7, 1999 || Socorro || LINEAR || KOR || align=right | 5.3 km || 
|-id=044 bgcolor=#E9E9E9
| 18044 ||  || — || September 7, 1999 || Socorro || LINEAR || — || align=right | 3.6 km || 
|-id=045 bgcolor=#d6d6d6
| 18045 ||  || — || September 8, 1999 || Socorro || LINEAR || — || align=right | 17 km || 
|-id=046 bgcolor=#C2FFFF
| 18046 ||  || — || September 9, 1999 || Socorro || LINEAR || L5 || align=right | 43 km || 
|-id=047 bgcolor=#d6d6d6
| 18047 ||  || — || September 9, 1999 || Socorro || LINEAR || — || align=right | 12 km || 
|-id=048 bgcolor=#d6d6d6
| 18048 ||  || — || September 9, 1999 || Socorro || LINEAR || — || align=right | 10 km || 
|-id=049 bgcolor=#E9E9E9
| 18049 ||  || — || September 8, 1999 || Socorro || LINEAR || — || align=right | 7.8 km || 
|-id=050 bgcolor=#d6d6d6
| 18050 ||  || — || September 8, 1999 || Socorro || LINEAR || EOS || align=right | 7.9 km || 
|-id=051 bgcolor=#d6d6d6
| 18051 ||  || — || September 8, 1999 || Socorro || LINEAR || — || align=right | 6.6 km || 
|-id=052 bgcolor=#d6d6d6
| 18052 ||  || — || September 8, 1999 || Socorro || LINEAR || — || align=right | 20 km || 
|-id=053 bgcolor=#d6d6d6
| 18053 ||  || — || September 8, 1999 || Socorro || LINEAR || — || align=right | 18 km || 
|-id=054 bgcolor=#C2FFFF
| 18054 ||  || — || September 29, 1999 || Socorro || LINEAR || L5 || align=right | 36 km || 
|-id=055 bgcolor=#E9E9E9
| 18055 Fernhildebrandt ||  ||  || October 11, 1999 || Farpoint || G. Hug, G. Bell || EUN || align=right | 5.4 km || 
|-id=056 bgcolor=#fefefe
| 18056 ||  || — || October 11, 1999 || Gnosca || S. Sposetti || FLO || align=right | 4.6 km || 
|-id=057 bgcolor=#E9E9E9
| 18057 ||  || — || November 9, 1999 || Oizumi || T. Kobayashi || — || align=right | 9.8 km || 
|-id=058 bgcolor=#C2FFFF
| 18058 ||  || — || December 12, 1999 || Socorro || LINEAR || L4slow || align=right | 21 km || 
|-id=059 bgcolor=#E9E9E9
| 18059 Cavalieri ||  ||  || December 15, 1999 || Prescott || P. G. Comba || — || align=right | 7.0 km || 
|-id=060 bgcolor=#C2FFFF
| 18060 Zarex ||  ||  || December 8, 1999 || Socorro || LINEAR || L4ERY || align=right | 36 km || 
|-id=061 bgcolor=#d6d6d6
| 18061 ||  || — || December 10, 1999 || Socorro || LINEAR || EOS || align=right | 6.1 km || 
|-id=062 bgcolor=#C2FFFF
| 18062 ||  || — || December 12, 1999 || Socorro || LINEAR || L4 || align=right | 30 km || 
|-id=063 bgcolor=#C2FFFF
| 18063 ||  || — || December 13, 1999 || Socorro || LINEAR || L4 || align=right | 31 km || 
|-id=064 bgcolor=#E9E9E9
| 18064 ||  || — || December 13, 1999 || Catalina || CSS || — || align=right | 5.4 km || 
|-id=065 bgcolor=#d6d6d6
| 18065 ||  || — || January 3, 2000 || Socorro || LINEAR || — || align=right | 7.2 km || 
|-id=066 bgcolor=#E9E9E9
| 18066 ||  || — || January 5, 2000 || Socorro || LINEAR || — || align=right | 6.4 km || 
|-id=067 bgcolor=#E9E9E9
| 18067 ||  || — || January 4, 2000 || Socorro || LINEAR || EUN || align=right | 8.3 km || 
|-id=068 bgcolor=#d6d6d6
| 18068 ||  || — || January 7, 2000 || Socorro || LINEAR || — || align=right | 10 km || 
|-id=069 bgcolor=#E9E9E9
| 18069 ||  || — || January 9, 2000 || Socorro || LINEAR || — || align=right | 3.7 km || 
|-id=070 bgcolor=#fefefe
| 18070 ||  || — || January 13, 2000 || Višnjan Observatory || K. Korlević || PHO || align=right | 5.6 km || 
|-id=071 bgcolor=#C2FFFF
| 18071 ||  || — || January 30, 2000 || Socorro || LINEAR || L4 || align=right | 22 km || 
|-id=072 bgcolor=#E9E9E9
| 18072 ||  || — || February 7, 2000 || Socorro || LINEAR || — || align=right | 4.5 km || 
|-id=073 bgcolor=#fefefe
| 18073 ||  || — || February 4, 2000 || Socorro || LINEAR || — || align=right | 2.1 km || 
|-id=074 bgcolor=#fefefe
| 18074 || 2000 DW || — || February 24, 2000 || Oizumi || T. Kobayashi || — || align=right | 3.5 km || 
|-id=075 bgcolor=#fefefe
| 18075 Donasharma ||  ||  || February 28, 2000 || Socorro || LINEAR || SUL || align=right | 5.3 km || 
|-id=076 bgcolor=#E9E9E9
| 18076 ||  || — || February 29, 2000 || Socorro || LINEAR || VIB || align=right | 6.7 km || 
|-id=077 bgcolor=#fefefe
| 18077 Dianeingrao ||  ||  || March 4, 2000 || Catalina || CSS || — || align=right | 4.6 km || 
|-id=078 bgcolor=#E9E9E9
| 18078 ||  || — || March 28, 2000 || Socorro || LINEAR || ADE || align=right | 12 km || 
|-id=079 bgcolor=#d6d6d6
| 18079 Lion-Stoppato ||  ||  || March 27, 2000 || Anderson Mesa || LONEOS || EOS || align=right | 7.4 km || 
|-id=080 bgcolor=#E9E9E9
| 18080 ||  || — || April 7, 2000 || Socorro || LINEAR || — || align=right | 3.2 km || 
|-id=081 bgcolor=#fefefe
| 18081 ||  || — || April 7, 2000 || Socorro || LINEAR || PHO || align=right | 7.3 km || 
|-id=082 bgcolor=#fefefe
| 18082 ||  || — || April 12, 2000 || Socorro || LINEAR || FLO || align=right | 3.6 km || 
|-id=083 bgcolor=#d6d6d6
| 18083 ||  || — || April 29, 2000 || Socorro || LINEAR || — || align=right | 10 km || 
|-id=084 bgcolor=#fefefe
| 18084 Adamwohl ||  ||  || April 29, 2000 || Socorro || LINEAR || V || align=right | 2.9 km || 
|-id=085 bgcolor=#fefefe
| 18085 ||  || — || May 6, 2000 || Socorro || LINEAR || — || align=right | 4.2 km || 
|-id=086 bgcolor=#d6d6d6
| 18086 Emilykraft ||  ||  || May 6, 2000 || Socorro || LINEAR || — || align=right | 5.8 km || 
|-id=087 bgcolor=#fefefe
| 18087 Yamanaka ||  ||  || May 6, 2000 || Socorro || LINEAR || NYS || align=right | 1.8 km || 
|-id=088 bgcolor=#fefefe
| 18088 Roberteunice ||  ||  || May 7, 2000 || Socorro || LINEAR || FLO || align=right | 6.9 km || 
|-id=089 bgcolor=#fefefe
| 18089 ||  || — || May 6, 2000 || Socorro || LINEAR || — || align=right | 2.9 km || 
|-id=090 bgcolor=#E9E9E9
| 18090 Kevinkuo ||  ||  || May 6, 2000 || Socorro || LINEAR || — || align=right | 4.4 km || 
|-id=091 bgcolor=#fefefe
| 18091 Iranmanesh ||  ||  || May 6, 2000 || Socorro || LINEAR || V || align=right | 3.9 km || 
|-id=092 bgcolor=#d6d6d6
| 18092 Reinhold ||  ||  || May 28, 2000 || Socorro || LINEAR || KOR || align=right | 6.1 km || 
|-id=093 bgcolor=#d6d6d6
| 18093 ||  || — || May 28, 2000 || Socorro || LINEAR || TIR || align=right | 6.8 km || 
|-id=094 bgcolor=#d6d6d6
| 18094 ||  || — || May 27, 2000 || Socorro || LINEAR || EOS || align=right | 7.3 km || 
|-id=095 bgcolor=#fefefe
| 18095 Frankblock ||  ||  || June 5, 2000 || Socorro || LINEAR || V || align=right | 3.1 km || 
|-id=096 bgcolor=#fefefe
| 18096 ||  || — || June 1, 2000 || Socorro || LINEAR || — || align=right | 7.4 km || 
|-id=097 bgcolor=#fefefe
| 18097 ||  || — || June 8, 2000 || Socorro || LINEAR || — || align=right | 3.6 km || 
|-id=098 bgcolor=#E9E9E9
| 18098 ||  || — || June 8, 2000 || Socorro || LINEAR || GEF || align=right | 5.6 km || 
|-id=099 bgcolor=#d6d6d6
| 18099 Flamini ||  ||  || June 6, 2000 || Anderson Mesa || LONEOS || EOS || align=right | 5.8 km || 
|-id=100 bgcolor=#fefefe
| 18100 Lebreton ||  ||  || June 6, 2000 || Anderson Mesa || LONEOS || — || align=right | 2.6 km || 
|}

18101–18200 

|-bgcolor=#fefefe
| 18101 Coustenis ||  ||  || June 5, 2000 || Anderson Mesa || LONEOS || FLO || align=right | 1.8 km || 
|-id=102 bgcolor=#fefefe
| 18102 Angrilli ||  ||  || June 3, 2000 || Anderson Mesa || LONEOS || — || align=right | 2.9 km || 
|-id=103 bgcolor=#fefefe
| 18103 ||  || — || June 26, 2000 || Socorro || LINEAR || V || align=right | 3.4 km || 
|-id=104 bgcolor=#fefefe
| 18104 Mahalingam ||  ||  || July 3, 2000 || Socorro || LINEAR || FLO || align=right | 2.8 km || 
|-id=105 bgcolor=#d6d6d6
| 18105 ||  || — || July 7, 2000 || Socorro || LINEAR || — || align=right | 12 km || 
|-id=106 bgcolor=#FFC2E0
| 18106 Blume ||  ||  || July 4, 2000 || Anderson Mesa || LONEOS || AMO +1km || align=right | 1.0 km || 
|-id=107 bgcolor=#fefefe
| 18107 ||  || — || July 7, 2000 || Socorro || LINEAR || NYS || align=right | 2.9 km || 
|-id=108 bgcolor=#E9E9E9
| 18108 ||  || — || July 8, 2000 || Socorro || LINEAR || — || align=right | 7.2 km || 
|-id=109 bgcolor=#FFC2E0
| 18109 ||  || — || July 7, 2000 || Socorro || LINEAR || AMO +1km || align=right | 1.4 km || 
|-id=110 bgcolor=#fefefe
| 18110 HASI ||  ||  || July 5, 2000 || Anderson Mesa || LONEOS || — || align=right | 2.0 km || 
|-id=111 bgcolor=#E9E9E9
| 18111 Pinet ||  ||  || July 5, 2000 || Anderson Mesa || LONEOS || AGN || align=right | 4.1 km || 
|-id=112 bgcolor=#E9E9E9
| 18112 Jeanlucjosset ||  ||  || July 5, 2000 || Anderson Mesa || LONEOS || — || align=right | 7.0 km || 
|-id=113 bgcolor=#fefefe
| 18113 Bibring ||  ||  || July 5, 2000 || Anderson Mesa || LONEOS || — || align=right | 3.3 km || 
|-id=114 bgcolor=#E9E9E9
| 18114 Rosenbush ||  ||  || July 5, 2000 || Anderson Mesa || LONEOS || — || align=right | 7.3 km || 
|-id=115 bgcolor=#d6d6d6
| 18115 Rathbun ||  ||  || July 5, 2000 || Anderson Mesa || LONEOS || EOS || align=right | 5.2 km || 
|-id=116 bgcolor=#fefefe
| 18116 Prato ||  ||  || July 5, 2000 || Anderson Mesa || LONEOS || — || align=right | 2.6 km || 
|-id=117 bgcolor=#fefefe
| 18117 Jonhodge ||  ||  || July 5, 2000 || Anderson Mesa || LONEOS || — || align=right | 3.2 km || 
|-id=118 bgcolor=#fefefe
| 18118 ||  || — || July 5, 2000 || Kitt Peak || Spacewatch || — || align=right | 2.6 km || 
|-id=119 bgcolor=#fefefe
| 18119 Braude ||  ||  || July 4, 2000 || Anderson Mesa || LONEOS || — || align=right | 2.5 km || 
|-id=120 bgcolor=#fefefe
| 18120 Lytvynenko ||  ||  || July 4, 2000 || Anderson Mesa || LONEOS || EUT || align=right | 2.0 km || 
|-id=121 bgcolor=#d6d6d6
| 18121 Konovalenko ||  ||  || July 4, 2000 || Anderson Mesa || LONEOS || — || align=right | 9.2 km || 
|-id=122 bgcolor=#d6d6d6
| 18122 Forestamartin ||  ||  || July 4, 2000 || Anderson Mesa || LONEOS || KOR || align=right | 6.6 km || 
|-id=123 bgcolor=#d6d6d6
| 18123 Pavan ||  ||  || July 4, 2000 || Anderson Mesa || LONEOS || — || align=right | 4.6 km || 
|-id=124 bgcolor=#fefefe
| 18124 Leeperry ||  ||  || July 3, 2000 || Socorro || LINEAR || — || align=right | 3.0 km || 
|-id=125 bgcolor=#d6d6d6
| 18125 Brianwilson || 2000 OF ||  || July 22, 2000 || Reedy Creek || J. Broughton || — || align=right | 4.3 km || 
|-id=126 bgcolor=#E9E9E9
| 18126 ||  || — || July 24, 2000 || Socorro || LINEAR || DOR || align=right | 10 km || 
|-id=127 bgcolor=#fefefe
| 18127 Denversmith ||  ||  || July 24, 2000 || Socorro || LINEAR || FLO || align=right | 2.8 km || 
|-id=128 bgcolor=#fefefe
| 18128 Wysner ||  ||  || July 24, 2000 || Socorro || LINEAR || FLO || align=right | 2.3 km || 
|-id=129 bgcolor=#fefefe
| 18129 ||  || — || July 24, 2000 || Socorro || LINEAR || — || align=right | 5.3 km || 
|-id=130 bgcolor=#fefefe
| 18130 ||  || — || July 24, 2000 || Socorro || LINEAR || — || align=right | 8.1 km || 
|-id=131 bgcolor=#d6d6d6
| 18131 ||  || — || July 24, 2000 || Socorro || LINEAR || — || align=right | 8.0 km || 
|-id=132 bgcolor=#fefefe
| 18132 Spector ||  ||  || July 30, 2000 || Reedy Creek || J. Broughton || — || align=right | 5.1 km || 
|-id=133 bgcolor=#E9E9E9
| 18133 ||  || — || July 23, 2000 || Socorro || LINEAR || — || align=right | 5.7 km || 
|-id=134 bgcolor=#d6d6d6
| 18134 ||  || — || July 23, 2000 || Socorro || LINEAR || URS || align=right | 19 km || 
|-id=135 bgcolor=#d6d6d6
| 18135 ||  || — || July 31, 2000 || Socorro || LINEAR || — || align=right | 14 km || 
|-id=136 bgcolor=#E9E9E9
| 18136 ||  || — || July 31, 2000 || Socorro || LINEAR || — || align=right | 4.4 km || 
|-id=137 bgcolor=#C2FFFF
| 18137 ||  || — || July 30, 2000 || Socorro || LINEAR || L5 || align=right | 34 km || 
|-id=138 bgcolor=#fefefe
| 18138 ||  || — || July 31, 2000 || Socorro || LINEAR || — || align=right | 2.9 km || 
|-id=139 bgcolor=#d6d6d6
| 18139 ||  || — || July 30, 2000 || Socorro || LINEAR || EOS || align=right | 6.7 km || 
|-id=140 bgcolor=#E9E9E9
| 18140 ||  || — || July 30, 2000 || Socorro || LINEAR || — || align=right | 4.4 km || 
|-id=141 bgcolor=#d6d6d6
| 18141 ||  || — || July 30, 2000 || Socorro || LINEAR || — || align=right | 9.0 km || 
|-id=142 bgcolor=#fefefe
| 18142 Adamsidman ||  ||  || July 31, 2000 || Socorro || LINEAR || FLO || align=right | 2.0 km || 
|-id=143 bgcolor=#E9E9E9
| 18143 ||  || — || July 31, 2000 || Socorro || LINEAR || — || align=right | 9.4 km || 
|-id=144 bgcolor=#E9E9E9
| 18144 ||  || — || July 31, 2000 || Socorro || LINEAR || MAR || align=right | 3.5 km || 
|-id=145 bgcolor=#fefefe
| 18145 ||  || — || July 31, 2000 || Socorro || LINEAR || — || align=right | 2.1 km || 
|-id=146 bgcolor=#E9E9E9
| 18146 ||  || — || July 31, 2000 || Socorro || LINEAR || EUN || align=right | 4.4 km || 
|-id=147 bgcolor=#E9E9E9
| 18147 ||  || — || July 31, 2000 || Socorro || LINEAR || EUN || align=right | 5.4 km || 
|-id=148 bgcolor=#d6d6d6
| 18148 Bellier ||  ||  || July 29, 2000 || Anderson Mesa || LONEOS || THM || align=right | 15 km || 
|-id=149 bgcolor=#d6d6d6
| 18149 Colombatti ||  ||  || July 29, 2000 || Anderson Mesa || LONEOS || KOR || align=right | 3.2 km || 
|-id=150 bgcolor=#d6d6d6
| 18150 Lopez-Moreno ||  ||  || July 29, 2000 || Anderson Mesa || LONEOS || 7:4 || align=right | 21 km || 
|-id=151 bgcolor=#d6d6d6
| 18151 Licchelli ||  ||  || July 29, 2000 || Anderson Mesa || LONEOS || — || align=right | 8.9 km || 
|-id=152 bgcolor=#d6d6d6
| 18152 Heidimanning ||  ||  || July 29, 2000 || Anderson Mesa || LONEOS || EOS || align=right | 7.6 km || 
|-id=153 bgcolor=#d6d6d6
| 18153 ||  || — || July 30, 2000 || Socorro || LINEAR || — || align=right | 17 km || 
|-id=154 bgcolor=#d6d6d6
| 18154 || 2000 PA || — || August 1, 2000 || Črni Vrh || Črni Vrh || KOR || align=right | 3.9 km || 
|-id=155 bgcolor=#E9E9E9
| 18155 Jasonschuler ||  ||  || August 1, 2000 || Socorro || LINEAR || — || align=right | 3.1 km || 
|-id=156 bgcolor=#d6d6d6
| 18156 Kamisaibara ||  ||  || August 3, 2000 || Bisei SG Center || BATTeRS || EOS || align=right | 10 km || 
|-id=157 bgcolor=#fefefe
| 18157 Craigwright ||  ||  || August 1, 2000 || Socorro || LINEAR || — || align=right | 3.1 km || 
|-id=158 bgcolor=#fefefe
| 18158 Nigelreuel ||  ||  || August 1, 2000 || Socorro || LINEAR || V || align=right | 2.7 km || 
|-id=159 bgcolor=#fefefe
| 18159 Andrewcook ||  ||  || August 1, 2000 || Socorro || LINEAR || — || align=right | 3.2 km || 
|-id=160 bgcolor=#d6d6d6
| 18160 Nihon Uchu Forum ||  ||  || August 7, 2000 || Bisei SG Center || BATTeRS || — || align=right | 11 km || 
|-id=161 bgcolor=#d6d6d6
| 18161 Koshiishi ||  ||  || August 7, 2000 || Bisei SG Center || BATTeRS || EOS || align=right | 12 km || 
|-id=162 bgcolor=#fefefe
| 18162 Denlea ||  ||  || August 1, 2000 || Socorro || LINEAR || — || align=right | 1.8 km || 
|-id=163 bgcolor=#fefefe
| 18163 Jennalewis ||  ||  || August 1, 2000 || Socorro || LINEAR || — || align=right | 3.2 km || 
|-id=164 bgcolor=#d6d6d6
| 18164 ||  || — || August 1, 2000 || Socorro || LINEAR || EOS || align=right | 8.2 km || 
|-id=165 bgcolor=#fefefe
| 18165 ||  || — || August 1, 2000 || Socorro || LINEAR || NYS || align=right | 1.8 km || 
|-id=166 bgcolor=#fefefe
| 18166 ||  || — || August 8, 2000 || Valinhos || P. R. Holvorcem || — || align=right | 2.5 km || 
|-id=167 bgcolor=#E9E9E9
| 18167 Buttani ||  ||  || August 6, 2000 || Valmeca || Valmeca Obs. || — || align=right | 9.2 km || 
|-id=168 bgcolor=#E9E9E9
| 18168 ||  || — || August 4, 2000 || Haleakala || NEAT || — || align=right | 4.5 km || 
|-id=169 bgcolor=#d6d6d6
| 18169 Amaldi || 2000 QF ||  || August 20, 2000 || Colleverde || V. S. Casulli || — || align=right | 23 km || 
|-id=170 bgcolor=#E9E9E9
| 18170 Ramjeawan ||  ||  || August 24, 2000 || Socorro || LINEAR || — || align=right | 5.4 km || 
|-id=171 bgcolor=#fefefe
| 18171 Romaneskue ||  ||  || August 24, 2000 || Socorro || LINEAR || NYS || align=right | 1.9 km || 
|-id=172 bgcolor=#FFC2E0
| 18172 ||  || — || August 25, 2000 || Socorro || LINEAR || AMO +1km || align=right | 2.7 km || 
|-id=173 bgcolor=#fefefe
| 18173 ||  || — || August 25, 2000 || Višnjan Observatory || K. Korlević, M. Jurić || — || align=right | 2.8 km || 
|-id=174 bgcolor=#fefefe
| 18174 Khachatryan ||  ||  || August 24, 2000 || Socorro || LINEAR || V || align=right | 2.3 km || 
|-id=175 bgcolor=#d6d6d6
| 18175 Jenniferchoy ||  ||  || August 24, 2000 || Socorro || LINEAR || KOR || align=right | 3.6 km || 
|-id=176 bgcolor=#E9E9E9
| 18176 Julianhong ||  ||  || August 24, 2000 || Socorro || LINEAR || — || align=right | 2.9 km || 
|-id=177 bgcolor=#E9E9E9
| 18177 Harunaga ||  ||  || August 24, 2000 || Socorro || LINEAR || — || align=right | 10 km || 
|-id=178 bgcolor=#fefefe
| 18178 ||  || — || August 24, 2000 || Socorro || LINEAR || — || align=right | 2.9 km || 
|-id=179 bgcolor=#fefefe
| 18179 ||  || — || August 25, 2000 || Socorro || LINEAR || V || align=right | 3.7 km || 
|-id=180 bgcolor=#fefefe
| 18180 Irenesun ||  ||  || August 25, 2000 || Socorro || LINEAR || FLO || align=right | 3.1 km || 
|-id=181 bgcolor=#FA8072
| 18181 ||  || — || August 26, 2000 || Socorro || LINEAR || PHO || align=right | 4.6 km || 
|-id=182 bgcolor=#d6d6d6
| 18182 Wiener ||  ||  || August 27, 2000 || Ondřejov || P. Pravec, P. Kušnirák || KOR || align=right | 4.1 km || 
|-id=183 bgcolor=#fefefe
| 18183 ||  || — || August 24, 2000 || Socorro || LINEAR || NYS || align=right | 2.5 km || 
|-id=184 bgcolor=#E9E9E9
| 18184 Dianepark ||  ||  || August 24, 2000 || Socorro || LINEAR || — || align=right | 3.4 km || 
|-id=185 bgcolor=#d6d6d6
| 18185 ||  || — || August 24, 2000 || Socorro || LINEAR || — || align=right | 9.9 km || 
|-id=186 bgcolor=#d6d6d6
| 18186 ||  || — || August 24, 2000 || Socorro || LINEAR || — || align=right | 7.0 km || 
|-id=187 bgcolor=#d6d6d6
| 18187 ||  || — || August 25, 2000 || Socorro || LINEAR || — || align=right | 5.8 km || 
|-id=188 bgcolor=#d6d6d6
| 18188 ||  || — || August 25, 2000 || Socorro || LINEAR || — || align=right | 6.9 km || 
|-id=189 bgcolor=#E9E9E9
| 18189 Medeobaldia ||  ||  || August 24, 2000 || Socorro || LINEAR || — || align=right | 7.6 km || 
|-id=190 bgcolor=#E9E9E9
| 18190 Michaelpizer ||  ||  || August 25, 2000 || Socorro || LINEAR || — || align=right | 3.7 km || 
|-id=191 bgcolor=#E9E9E9
| 18191 Rayhe ||  ||  || August 25, 2000 || Socorro || LINEAR || HOF || align=right | 11 km || 
|-id=192 bgcolor=#E9E9E9
| 18192 Craigwallace ||  ||  || August 25, 2000 || Socorro || LINEAR || — || align=right | 7.1 km || 
|-id=193 bgcolor=#fefefe
| 18193 Hollilydrury ||  ||  || August 26, 2000 || Socorro || LINEAR || — || align=right | 2.7 km || 
|-id=194 bgcolor=#d6d6d6
| 18194 ||  || — || August 28, 2000 || Socorro || LINEAR || — || align=right | 9.3 km || 
|-id=195 bgcolor=#FA8072
| 18195 ||  || — || August 28, 2000 || Socorro || LINEAR || — || align=right | 1.9 km || 
|-id=196 bgcolor=#fefefe
| 18196 Rowberry ||  ||  || August 26, 2000 || Socorro || LINEAR || — || align=right | 3.0 km || 
|-id=197 bgcolor=#fefefe
| 18197 || 2055 P-L || — || September 24, 1960 || Palomar || PLS || — || align=right | 2.8 km || 
|-id=198 bgcolor=#d6d6d6
| 18198 || 2056 P-L || — || September 24, 1960 || Palomar || PLS || — || align=right | 9.7 km || 
|-id=199 bgcolor=#d6d6d6
| 18199 || 2583 P-L || — || September 24, 1960 || Palomar || PLS || KOR || align=right | 4.0 km || 
|-id=200 bgcolor=#fefefe
| 18200 || 2714 P-L || — || September 24, 1960 || Palomar || PLS || — || align=right | 2.4 km || 
|}

18201–18300 

|-bgcolor=#E9E9E9
| 18201 || 2733 P-L || — || September 24, 1960 || Palomar || PLS || — || align=right | 2.7 km || 
|-id=202 bgcolor=#d6d6d6
| 18202 || 2757 P-L || — || September 24, 1960 || Palomar || PLS || — || align=right | 7.5 km || 
|-id=203 bgcolor=#E9E9E9
| 18203 || 2837 P-L || — || September 24, 1960 || Palomar || PLS || — || align=right | 2.5 km || 
|-id=204 bgcolor=#E9E9E9
| 18204 || 3065 P-L || — || September 24, 1960 || Palomar || PLS || — || align=right | 6.1 km || 
|-id=205 bgcolor=#d6d6d6
| 18205 || 3090 P-L || — || September 24, 1960 || Palomar || PLS || — || align=right | 12 km || 
|-id=206 bgcolor=#d6d6d6
| 18206 || 3093 P-L || — || September 24, 1960 || Palomar || PLS || — || align=right | 12 km || 
|-id=207 bgcolor=#fefefe
| 18207 || 4041 P-L || — || September 24, 1960 || Palomar || PLS || NYS || align=right | 4.4 km || 
|-id=208 bgcolor=#E9E9E9
| 18208 || 4095 P-L || — || September 24, 1960 || Palomar || PLS || MRX || align=right | 2.2 km || 
|-id=209 bgcolor=#fefefe
| 18209 || 4158 P-L || — || September 24, 1960 || Palomar || PLS || — || align=right | 2.7 km || 
|-id=210 bgcolor=#d6d6d6
| 18210 || 4529 P-L || — || September 24, 1960 || Palomar || PLS || HYG || align=right | 7.0 km || 
|-id=211 bgcolor=#fefefe
| 18211 || 4597 P-L || — || September 24, 1960 || Palomar || PLS || — || align=right | 2.2 km || 
|-id=212 bgcolor=#d6d6d6
| 18212 || 4603 P-L || — || September 24, 1960 || Palomar || PLS || THM || align=right | 10 km || 
|-id=213 bgcolor=#E9E9E9
| 18213 || 4607 P-L || — || September 24, 1960 || Palomar || PLS || — || align=right | 9.0 km || 
|-id=214 bgcolor=#d6d6d6
| 18214 || 4615 P-L || — || September 24, 1960 || Palomar || PLS || THM || align=right | 8.8 km || 
|-id=215 bgcolor=#d6d6d6
| 18215 || 4792 P-L || — || September 24, 1960 || Palomar || PLS || — || align=right | 3.5 km || 
|-id=216 bgcolor=#E9E9E9
| 18216 || 4917 P-L || — || September 24, 1960 || Palomar || PLS || — || align=right | 3.1 km || 
|-id=217 bgcolor=#fefefe
| 18217 || 5021 P-L || — || October 17, 1960 || Palomar || PLS || — || align=right | 2.7 km || 
|-id=218 bgcolor=#E9E9E9
| 18218 || 6245 P-L || — || September 24, 1960 || Palomar || PLS || EUN || align=right | 4.0 km || 
|-id=219 bgcolor=#d6d6d6
| 18219 || 6260 P-L || — || September 24, 1960 || Palomar || PLS || URS || align=right | 23 km || 
|-id=220 bgcolor=#d6d6d6
| 18220 || 6286 P-L || — || September 24, 1960 || Palomar || PLS || — || align=right | 8.4 km || 
|-id=221 bgcolor=#d6d6d6
| 18221 || 6526 P-L || — || September 24, 1960 || Palomar || PLS || — || align=right | 7.1 km || 
|-id=222 bgcolor=#fefefe
| 18222 || 6669 P-L || — || September 24, 1960 || Palomar || PLS || — || align=right | 2.0 km || 
|-id=223 bgcolor=#E9E9E9
| 18223 || 6700 P-L || — || September 24, 1960 || Palomar || PLS || — || align=right | 5.2 km || 
|-id=224 bgcolor=#d6d6d6
| 18224 || 6726 P-L || — || September 24, 1960 || Palomar || PLS || — || align=right | 3.0 km || 
|-id=225 bgcolor=#E9E9E9
| 18225 || 7069 P-L || — || October 22, 1960 || Palomar || PLS || — || align=right | 3.5 km || 
|-id=226 bgcolor=#E9E9E9
| 18226 || 1182 T-1 || — || March 25, 1971 || Palomar || PLS || EUN || align=right | 5.6 km || 
|-id=227 bgcolor=#fefefe
| 18227 || 1222 T-1 || — || March 25, 1971 || Palomar || PLS || — || align=right | 7.8 km || 
|-id=228 bgcolor=#C2FFFF
| 18228 Hyperenor || 3163 T-1 ||  || March 26, 1971 || Palomar || PLS || L5 || align=right | 23 km || 
|-id=229 bgcolor=#fefefe
| 18229 || 3222 T-1 || — || March 26, 1971 || Palomar || PLS || — || align=right | 2.5 km || 
|-id=230 bgcolor=#fefefe
| 18230 || 3285 T-1 || — || March 26, 1971 || Palomar || PLS || — || align=right | 2.9 km || 
|-id=231 bgcolor=#E9E9E9
| 18231 || 3286 T-1 || — || March 26, 1971 || Palomar || PLS || — || align=right | 6.4 km || 
|-id=232 bgcolor=#E9E9E9
| 18232 || 3322 T-1 || — || March 26, 1971 || Palomar || PLS || — || align=right | 6.8 km || 
|-id=233 bgcolor=#d6d6d6
| 18233 || 4068 T-1 || — || March 26, 1971 || Palomar || PLS || — || align=right | 9.2 km || 
|-id=234 bgcolor=#E9E9E9
| 18234 || 4262 T-1 || — || March 26, 1971 || Palomar || PLS || — || align=right | 9.3 km || 
|-id=235 bgcolor=#d6d6d6
| 18235 Lynden-Bell || 1003 T-2 ||  || September 29, 1973 || Palomar || PLS || THM || align=right | 8.8 km || 
|-id=236 bgcolor=#fefefe
| 18236 Bernardburke || 1059 T-2 ||  || September 29, 1973 || Palomar || PLS || — || align=right | 4.0 km || 
|-id=237 bgcolor=#fefefe
| 18237 Kenfreeman || 1182 T-2 ||  || September 29, 1973 || Palomar || PLS || NYS || align=right | 2.2 km || 
|-id=238 bgcolor=#d6d6d6
| 18238 Frankshu || 1241 T-2 ||  || September 29, 1973 || Palomar || PLS || — || align=right | 4.8 km || 
|-id=239 bgcolor=#d6d6d6
| 18239 Ekers || 1251 T-2 ||  || September 29, 1973 || Palomar || PLS || — || align=right | 10 km || 
|-id=240 bgcolor=#fefefe
| 18240 Mould || 1317 T-2 ||  || September 29, 1973 || Palomar || PLS || V || align=right | 1.6 km || 
|-id=241 bgcolor=#E9E9E9
| 18241 Genzel || 1325 T-2 ||  || September 29, 1973 || Palomar || PLS || PAD || align=right | 6.6 km || 
|-id=242 bgcolor=#fefefe
| 18242 Peebles || 2102 T-2 ||  || September 29, 1973 || Palomar || PLS || NYS || align=right | 2.0 km || 
|-id=243 bgcolor=#fefefe
| 18243 Gunn || 2272 T-2 ||  || September 29, 1973 || Palomar || PLS || FLO || align=right | 4.9 km || 
|-id=244 bgcolor=#E9E9E9
| 18244 Anneila || 3008 T-2 ||  || September 30, 1973 || Palomar || PLS || GEF || align=right | 2.9 km || 
|-id=245 bgcolor=#d6d6d6
| 18245 || 3061 T-2 || — || September 30, 1973 || Palomar || PLS || — || align=right | 7.4 km || 
|-id=246 bgcolor=#E9E9E9
| 18246 || 3088 T-2 || — || September 30, 1973 || Palomar || PLS || — || align=right | 4.4 km || 
|-id=247 bgcolor=#fefefe
| 18247 || 3151 T-2 || — || September 30, 1973 || Palomar || PLS || FLO || align=right | 2.5 km || 
|-id=248 bgcolor=#fefefe
| 18248 || 3152 T-2 || — || September 30, 1973 || Palomar || PLS || — || align=right | 2.0 km || 
|-id=249 bgcolor=#fefefe
| 18249 || 3175 T-2 || — || September 30, 1973 || Palomar || PLS || FLO || align=right | 1.3 km || 
|-id=250 bgcolor=#d6d6d6
| 18250 || 3178 T-2 || — || September 30, 1973 || Palomar || PLS || — || align=right | 4.4 km || 
|-id=251 bgcolor=#fefefe
| 18251 || 3207 T-2 || — || September 30, 1973 || Palomar || PLS || FLO || align=right | 2.7 km || 
|-id=252 bgcolor=#fefefe
| 18252 || 3282 T-2 || — || September 30, 1973 || Palomar || PLS || — || align=right | 2.5 km || 
|-id=253 bgcolor=#fefefe
| 18253 || 3295 T-2 || — || September 30, 1973 || Palomar || PLS || V || align=right | 2.5 km || 
|-id=254 bgcolor=#E9E9E9
| 18254 || 4062 T-2 || — || September 29, 1973 || Palomar || PLS || — || align=right | 8.3 km || 
|-id=255 bgcolor=#E9E9E9
| 18255 || 4188 T-2 || — || September 29, 1973 || Palomar || PLS || — || align=right | 5.9 km || 
|-id=256 bgcolor=#E9E9E9
| 18256 || 4195 T-2 || — || September 29, 1973 || Palomar || PLS || — || align=right | 6.8 km || 
|-id=257 bgcolor=#d6d6d6
| 18257 || 4209 T-2 || — || September 29, 1973 || Palomar || PLS || HYG || align=right | 6.9 km || 
|-id=258 bgcolor=#E9E9E9
| 18258 || 4250 T-2 || — || September 29, 1973 || Palomar || PLS || — || align=right | 4.3 km || 
|-id=259 bgcolor=#fefefe
| 18259 || 4311 T-2 || — || September 29, 1973 || Palomar || PLS || — || align=right | 2.0 km || 
|-id=260 bgcolor=#fefefe
| 18260 || 5056 T-2 || — || September 25, 1973 || Palomar || PLS || — || align=right | 2.7 km || 
|-id=261 bgcolor=#fefefe
| 18261 || 5065 T-2 || — || September 25, 1973 || Palomar || PLS || — || align=right | 2.9 km || 
|-id=262 bgcolor=#d6d6d6
| 18262 || 5125 T-2 || — || September 25, 1973 || Palomar || PLS || — || align=right | 9.1 km || 
|-id=263 bgcolor=#C2FFFF
| 18263 Anchialos || 5167 T-2 ||  || September 25, 1973 || Palomar || PLS || L4 || align=right | 21 km || 
|-id=264 bgcolor=#d6d6d6
| 18264 || 5184 T-2 || — || September 25, 1973 || Palomar || PLS || EOS || align=right | 4.7 km || 
|-id=265 bgcolor=#fefefe
| 18265 || 1136 T-3 || — || October 16, 1977 || Palomar || PLS || FLO || align=right | 2.1 km || 
|-id=266 bgcolor=#fefefe
| 18266 || 1189 T-3 || — || October 17, 1977 || Palomar || PLS || — || align=right | 2.2 km || 
|-id=267 bgcolor=#fefefe
| 18267 || 2122 T-3 || — || October 16, 1977 || Palomar || PLS || — || align=right | 1.8 km || 
|-id=268 bgcolor=#C2FFFF
| 18268 Dardanos || 2140 T-3 ||  || October 16, 1977 || Palomar || PLS || L5 || align=right | 20 km || 
|-id=269 bgcolor=#E9E9E9
| 18269 || 2206 T-3 || — || October 16, 1977 || Palomar || PLS || AGN || align=right | 3.1 km || 
|-id=270 bgcolor=#fefefe
| 18270 || 2312 T-3 || — || October 16, 1977 || Palomar || PLS || — || align=right | 2.5 km || 
|-id=271 bgcolor=#fefefe
| 18271 || 2332 T-3 || — || October 16, 1977 || Palomar || PLS || V || align=right | 4.3 km || 
|-id=272 bgcolor=#fefefe
| 18272 || 2495 T-3 || — || October 16, 1977 || Palomar || PLS || — || align=right | 2.7 km || 
|-id=273 bgcolor=#fefefe
| 18273 || 3140 T-3 || — || October 16, 1977 || Palomar || PLS || — || align=right | 2.2 km || 
|-id=274 bgcolor=#E9E9E9
| 18274 || 3150 T-3 || — || October 16, 1977 || Palomar || PLS || AST || align=right | 5.1 km || 
|-id=275 bgcolor=#E9E9E9
| 18275 || 3173 T-3 || — || October 16, 1977 || Palomar || PLS || — || align=right | 6.7 km || 
|-id=276 bgcolor=#E9E9E9
| 18276 || 3355 T-3 || — || October 16, 1977 || Palomar || PLS || — || align=right | 6.0 km || 
|-id=277 bgcolor=#E9E9E9
| 18277 || 3446 T-3 || — || October 16, 1977 || Palomar || PLS || — || align=right | 8.2 km || 
|-id=278 bgcolor=#C2FFFF
| 18278 Drymas || 4035 T-3 ||  || October 16, 1977 || Palomar || PLS || L5 || align=right | 29 km || 
|-id=279 bgcolor=#E9E9E9
| 18279 || 4221 T-3 || — || October 16, 1977 || Palomar || PLS || — || align=right | 8.9 km || 
|-id=280 bgcolor=#fefefe
| 18280 || 4245 T-3 || — || October 16, 1977 || Palomar || PLS || V || align=right | 3.1 km || 
|-id=281 bgcolor=#C2FFFF
| 18281 Tros || 4317 T-3 ||  || October 16, 1977 || Palomar || PLS || L5 || align=right | 14 km || 
|-id=282 bgcolor=#C2FFFF
| 18282 Ilos || 4369 T-3 ||  || October 16, 1977 || Palomar || PLS || L5 || align=right | 15 km || 
|-id=283 bgcolor=#fefefe
| 18283 || 5165 T-3 || — || October 16, 1977 || Palomar || PLS || V || align=right | 2.6 km || 
|-id=284 bgcolor=#FA8072
| 18284 Tsereteli || 1970 PU ||  || August 10, 1970 || Nauchnij || Crimean Astrophysical Obs. || — || align=right | 3.4 km || 
|-id=285 bgcolor=#E9E9E9
| 18285 Vladplatonov || 1972 GJ ||  || April 14, 1972 || Nauchnij || L. I. Chernykh || ADE || align=right | 16 km || 
|-id=286 bgcolor=#fefefe
| 18286 Kneipp ||  ||  || October 27, 1973 || Tautenburg Observatory || F. Börngen || NYS || align=right | 2.3 km || 
|-id=287 bgcolor=#fefefe
| 18287 Verkin ||  ||  || October 3, 1975 || Nauchnij || L. I. Chernykh || — || align=right | 5.7 km || 
|-id=288 bgcolor=#d6d6d6
| 18288 Nozdrachev ||  ||  || November 2, 1975 || Nauchnij || T. M. Smirnova || — || align=right | 8.8 km || 
|-id=289 bgcolor=#E9E9E9
| 18289 Yokoyamakoichi ||  ||  || October 22, 1976 || Kiso || H. Kosai, K. Furukawa || — || align=right | 9.9 km || 
|-id=290 bgcolor=#fefefe
| 18290 Sumiyoshi ||  ||  || February 18, 1977 || Kiso || H. Kosai, K. Furukawa || V || align=right | 3.7 km || 
|-id=291 bgcolor=#E9E9E9
| 18291 Wani ||  ||  || February 18, 1977 || Kiso || H. Kosai, K. Furukawa || — || align=right | 3.6 km || 
|-id=292 bgcolor=#d6d6d6
| 18292 Zoltowski || 1977 FB ||  || March 17, 1977 || Harvard Observatory || Harvard Obs. || KOR || align=right | 4.6 km || 
|-id=293 bgcolor=#fefefe
| 18293 Pilyugin ||  ||  || September 27, 1978 || Nauchnij || L. I. Chernykh || — || align=right | 4.0 km || 
|-id=294 bgcolor=#fefefe
| 18294 Rudenko ||  ||  || September 27, 1978 || Nauchnij || L. I. Chernykh || FLO || align=right | 3.0 km || 
|-id=295 bgcolor=#E9E9E9
| 18295 Borispetrov ||  ||  || October 2, 1978 || Nauchnij || L. V. Zhuravleva || — || align=right | 6.8 km || 
|-id=296 bgcolor=#d6d6d6
| 18296 ||  || — || November 7, 1978 || Palomar || E. F. Helin, S. J. Bus || THM || align=right | 7.2 km || 
|-id=297 bgcolor=#E9E9E9
| 18297 ||  || — || November 7, 1978 || Palomar || E. F. Helin, S. J. Bus || HEN || align=right | 3.1 km || 
|-id=298 bgcolor=#E9E9E9
| 18298 ||  || — || June 25, 1979 || Siding Spring || E. F. Helin, S. J. Bus || RAF || align=right | 2.8 km || 
|-id=299 bgcolor=#d6d6d6
| 18299 ||  || — || June 25, 1979 || Siding Spring || E. F. Helin, S. J. Bus || — || align=right | 9.2 km || 
|-id=300 bgcolor=#E9E9E9
| 18300 || 1979 PA || — || August 14, 1979 || Kleť || A. Mrkos || — || align=right | 9.7 km || 
|}

18301–18400 

|-bgcolor=#fefefe
| 18301 Konyukhov ||  ||  || August 27, 1979 || Nauchnij || N. S. Chernykh || FLO || align=right | 4.9 km || 
|-id=302 bgcolor=#E9E9E9
| 18302 Körner ||  ||  || March 16, 1980 || La Silla || C.-I. Lagerkvist || — || align=right | 10 km || 
|-id=303 bgcolor=#fefefe
| 18303 || 1980 PU || — || August 6, 1980 || Kleť || Z. Vávrová || moon || align=right | 3.8 km || 
|-id=304 bgcolor=#d6d6d6
| 18304 ||  || — || February 28, 1981 || Siding Spring || S. J. Bus || — || align=right | 6.0 km || 
|-id=305 bgcolor=#d6d6d6
| 18305 ||  || — || February 28, 1981 || Siding Spring || S. J. Bus || — || align=right | 8.1 km || 
|-id=306 bgcolor=#fefefe
| 18306 ||  || — || March 1, 1981 || Siding Spring || S. J. Bus || FLO || align=right | 2.6 km || 
|-id=307 bgcolor=#fefefe
| 18307 ||  || — || March 1, 1981 || Siding Spring || S. J. Bus || — || align=right | 2.8 km || 
|-id=308 bgcolor=#fefefe
| 18308 ||  || — || March 7, 1981 || Siding Spring || S. J. Bus || — || align=right | 2.6 km || 
|-id=309 bgcolor=#d6d6d6
| 18309 ||  || — || March 1, 1981 || Siding Spring || S. J. Bus || — || align=right | 6.7 km || 
|-id=310 bgcolor=#fefefe
| 18310 ||  || — || March 1, 1981 || Siding Spring || S. J. Bus || V || align=right | 1.7 km || 
|-id=311 bgcolor=#fefefe
| 18311 ||  || — || March 6, 1981 || Siding Spring || S. J. Bus || — || align=right | 2.1 km || 
|-id=312 bgcolor=#fefefe
| 18312 ||  || — || March 2, 1981 || Siding Spring || S. J. Bus || — || align=right | 3.1 km || 
|-id=313 bgcolor=#fefefe
| 18313 ||  || — || March 2, 1981 || Siding Spring || S. J. Bus || NYS || align=right | 3.6 km || 
|-id=314 bgcolor=#fefefe
| 18314 ||  || — || March 2, 1981 || Siding Spring || S. J. Bus || EUT || align=right | 1.9 km || 
|-id=315 bgcolor=#fefefe
| 18315 ||  || — || March 11, 1981 || Siding Spring || S. J. Bus || — || align=right | 3.0 km || 
|-id=316 bgcolor=#E9E9E9
| 18316 ||  || — || March 1, 1981 || Siding Spring || S. J. Bus || — || align=right | 4.6 km || 
|-id=317 bgcolor=#d6d6d6
| 18317 ||  || — || March 2, 1981 || Siding Spring || S. J. Bus || — || align=right | 8.6 km || 
|-id=318 bgcolor=#d6d6d6
| 18318 ||  || — || March 6, 1981 || Siding Spring || S. J. Bus || EUP || align=right | 7.1 km || 
|-id=319 bgcolor=#fefefe
| 18319 ||  || — || August 23, 1981 || La Silla || H. Debehogne || NYS || align=right | 2.8 km || 
|-id=320 bgcolor=#fefefe
| 18320 ||  || — || October 24, 1981 || Palomar || S. J. Bus || NYS || align=right | 2.8 km || 
|-id=321 bgcolor=#E9E9E9
| 18321 Bobrov ||  ||  || October 25, 1982 || Nauchnij || L. V. Zhuravleva || — || align=right | 3.8 km || 
|-id=322 bgcolor=#E9E9E9
| 18322 Korokan ||  ||  || November 14, 1982 || Kiso || H. Kosai, K. Furukawa || — || align=right | 4.2 km || 
|-id=323 bgcolor=#E9E9E9
| 18323 ||  || — || September 2, 1983 || La Silla || H. Debehogne || RAF || align=right | 5.7 km || 
|-id=324 bgcolor=#d6d6d6
| 18324 ||  || — || April 27, 1984 || La Silla || La Silla Obs. || — || align=right | 10 km || 
|-id=325 bgcolor=#E9E9E9
| 18325 ||  || — || September 29, 1984 || Kleť || A. Mrkos || — || align=right | 6.6 km || 
|-id=326 bgcolor=#d6d6d6
| 18326 ||  || — || February 11, 1985 || La Silla || H. Debehogne || THM || align=right | 8.9 km || 
|-id=327 bgcolor=#fefefe
| 18327 ||  || — || February 12, 1985 || La Silla || H. Debehogne || — || align=right | 2.7 km || 
|-id=328 bgcolor=#fefefe
| 18328 || 1985 UU || — || October 20, 1985 || Kleť || A. Mrkos || — || align=right | 4.9 km || 
|-id=329 bgcolor=#fefefe
| 18329 ||  || — || September 1, 1986 || La Silla || H. Debehogne || FLO || align=right | 3.1 km || 
|-id=330 bgcolor=#fefefe
| 18330 ||  || — || January 25, 1987 || La Silla || E. W. Elst || — || align=right | 2.2 km || 
|-id=331 bgcolor=#d6d6d6
| 18331 ||  || — || February 24, 1987 || La Silla || H. Debehogne || URS || align=right | 28 km || 
|-id=332 bgcolor=#E9E9E9
| 18332 || 1987 ON || — || July 19, 1987 || Palomar || E. F. Helin || EUN || align=right | 6.5 km || 
|-id=333 bgcolor=#E9E9E9
| 18333 || 1987 OV || — || July 19, 1987 || Palomar || E. F. Helin || KON || align=right | 10 km || 
|-id=334 bgcolor=#E9E9E9
| 18334 Drozdov ||  ||  || September 2, 1987 || Nauchnij || L. G. Karachkina || — || align=right | 4.2 km || 
|-id=335 bgcolor=#E9E9E9
| 18335 San Cassiano ||  ||  || September 19, 1987 || Anderson Mesa || E. Bowell || — || align=right | 4.3 km || 
|-id=336 bgcolor=#fefefe
| 18336 || 1988 LG || — || June 15, 1988 || Palomar || E. F. Helin || — || align=right | 12 km || 
|-id=337 bgcolor=#d6d6d6
| 18337 ||  || — || September 14, 1988 || Cerro Tololo || S. J. Bus || THM || align=right | 5.3 km || 
|-id=338 bgcolor=#E9E9E9
| 18338 ||  || — || March 4, 1989 || Palomar || E. F. Helin || GEF || align=right | 5.0 km || 
|-id=339 bgcolor=#E9E9E9
| 18339 ||  || — || April 3, 1989 || La Silla || E. W. Elst || — || align=right | 6.9 km || 
|-id=340 bgcolor=#d6d6d6
| 18340 || 1989 OM || — || July 29, 1989 || Lake Tekapo || A. C. Gilmore, P. M. Kilmartin || — || align=right | 13 km || 
|-id=341 bgcolor=#fefefe
| 18341 ||  || — || September 26, 1989 || La Silla || E. W. Elst || V || align=right | 4.4 km || 
|-id=342 bgcolor=#fefefe
| 18342 ||  || — || September 26, 1989 || La Silla || H. Debehogne || NYS || align=right | 1.8 km || 
|-id=343 bgcolor=#fefefe
| 18343 Asja || 1989 TN ||  || October 2, 1989 || Smolyan || E. W. Elst || NYS || align=right | 3.4 km || 
|-id=344 bgcolor=#fefefe
| 18344 ||  || — || October 2, 1989 || Cerro Tololo || S. J. Bus || FLO || align=right | 3.3 km || 
|-id=345 bgcolor=#d6d6d6
| 18345 ||  || — || October 22, 1989 || Kleť || Z. Vávrová || — || align=right | 9.2 km || 
|-id=346 bgcolor=#fefefe
| 18346 || 1989 WG || — || November 20, 1989 || Gekko || Y. Oshima || — || align=right | 6.4 km || 
|-id=347 bgcolor=#fefefe
| 18347 || 1989 WU || — || November 20, 1989 || Oohira || Oohira Stn. || — || align=right | 4.0 km || 
|-id=348 bgcolor=#fefefe
| 18348 ||  || — || January 22, 1990 || Palomar || E. F. Helin || PHO || align=right | 4.7 km || 
|-id=349 bgcolor=#d6d6d6
| 18349 Dafydd ||  ||  || July 25, 1990 || Palomar || H. E. Holt || — || align=right | 11 km || 
|-id=350 bgcolor=#fefefe
| 18350 ||  || — || August 22, 1990 || Palomar || H. E. Holt || — || align=right | 2.2 km || 
|-id=351 bgcolor=#E9E9E9
| 18351 ||  || — || August 29, 1990 || Palomar || H. E. Holt || GEF || align=right | 5.8 km || 
|-id=352 bgcolor=#E9E9E9
| 18352 ||  || — || August 16, 1990 || La Silla || E. W. Elst || — || align=right | 7.5 km || 
|-id=353 bgcolor=#E9E9E9
| 18353 ||  || — || August 16, 1990 || La Silla || E. W. Elst || — || align=right | 11 km || 
|-id=354 bgcolor=#d6d6d6
| 18354 ||  || — || September 15, 1990 || Palomar || H. E. Holt || — || align=right | 7.1 km || 
|-id=355 bgcolor=#E9E9E9
| 18355 ||  || — || September 14, 1990 || Palomar || H. E. Holt || — || align=right | 10 km || 
|-id=356 bgcolor=#d6d6d6
| 18356 ||  || — || September 16, 1990 || Palomar || H. E. Holt || — || align=right | 9.4 km || 
|-id=357 bgcolor=#fefefe
| 18357 ||  || — || September 18, 1990 || Palomar || H. E. Holt || FLO || align=right | 2.9 km || 
|-id=358 bgcolor=#fefefe
| 18358 ||  || — || September 16, 1990 || Palomar || H. E. Holt || FLO || align=right | 3.6 km || 
|-id=359 bgcolor=#d6d6d6
| 18359 Jakobstaude ||  ||  || October 13, 1990 || Tautenburg Observatory || L. D. Schmadel, F. Börngen || KOR || align=right | 3.6 km || 
|-id=360 bgcolor=#E9E9E9
| 18360 Sachs ||  ||  || October 10, 1990 || Tautenburg Observatory || F. Börngen, L. D. Schmadel || — || align=right | 6.5 km || 
|-id=361 bgcolor=#fefefe
| 18361 ||  || — || November 15, 1990 || La Silla || E. W. Elst || V || align=right | 2.3 km || 
|-id=362 bgcolor=#d6d6d6
| 18362 ||  || — || November 15, 1990 || La Silla || E. W. Elst || EOS || align=right | 5.5 km || 
|-id=363 bgcolor=#E9E9E9
| 18363 ||  || — || November 12, 1990 || La Silla || E. W. Elst || — || align=right | 7.3 km || 
|-id=364 bgcolor=#d6d6d6
| 18364 ||  || — || November 16, 1990 || La Silla || E. W. Elst || — || align=right | 14 km || 
|-id=365 bgcolor=#d6d6d6
| 18365 Shimomoto ||  ||  || November 17, 1990 || Geisei || T. Seki || EOS || align=right | 15 km || 
|-id=366 bgcolor=#d6d6d6
| 18366 ||  || — || February 18, 1991 || Palomar || E. F. Helin || HYG || align=right | 7.3 km || 
|-id=367 bgcolor=#fefefe
| 18367 ||  || — || March 17, 1991 || La Silla || H. Debehogne || — || align=right | 3.6 km || 
|-id=368 bgcolor=#fefefe
| 18368 Flandrau ||  ||  || April 15, 1991 || Palomar || C. S. Shoemaker, D. H. Levy || H || align=right | 1.9 km || 
|-id=369 bgcolor=#E9E9E9
| 18369 || 1991 LM || — || June 13, 1991 || Palomar || E. F. Helin || — || align=right | 7.0 km || 
|-id=370 bgcolor=#E9E9E9
| 18370 ||  || — || July 12, 1991 || Palomar || H. E. Holt || — || align=right | 4.8 km || 
|-id=371 bgcolor=#E9E9E9
| 18371 ||  || — || August 7, 1991 || Palomar || H. E. Holt || — || align=right | 6.7 km || 
|-id=372 bgcolor=#E9E9E9
| 18372 ||  || — || September 15, 1991 || Palomar || H. E. Holt || — || align=right | 4.5 km || 
|-id=373 bgcolor=#E9E9E9
| 18373 ||  || — || September 15, 1991 || Palomar || H. E. Holt || — || align=right | 3.1 km || 
|-id=374 bgcolor=#E9E9E9
| 18374 ||  || — || September 13, 1991 || Palomar || H. E. Holt || — || align=right | 7.8 km || 
|-id=375 bgcolor=#E9E9E9
| 18375 ||  || — || September 13, 1991 || Palomar || H. E. Holt || EUN || align=right | 6.0 km || 
|-id=376 bgcolor=#E9E9E9
| 18376 Quirk || 1991 SQ ||  || September 30, 1991 || Siding Spring || R. H. McNaught || — || align=right | 6.5 km || 
|-id=377 bgcolor=#E9E9E9
| 18377 Vetter ||  ||  || September 28, 1991 || Siding Spring || R. H. McNaught || — || align=right | 11 km || 
|-id=378 bgcolor=#E9E9E9
| 18378 ||  || — || October 31, 1991 || Kushiro || S. Ueda, H. Kaneda || — || align=right | 4.0 km || 
|-id=379 bgcolor=#E9E9E9
| 18379 Josévandam ||  ||  || November 6, 1991 || La Silla || E. W. Elst || — || align=right | 7.3 km || 
|-id=380 bgcolor=#E9E9E9
| 18380 ||  || — || November 4, 1991 || Kitt Peak || Spacewatch || — || align=right | 4.0 km || 
|-id=381 bgcolor=#E9E9E9
| 18381 Massenet || 1991 YU ||  || December 30, 1991 || Haute Provence || E. W. Elst || — || align=right | 8.8 km || 
|-id=382 bgcolor=#fefefe
| 18382 ||  || — || March 1, 1992 || La Silla || UESAC || — || align=right | 3.5 km || 
|-id=383 bgcolor=#d6d6d6
| 18383 ||  || — || March 8, 1992 || La Silla || UESAC || THM || align=right | 5.9 km || 
|-id=384 bgcolor=#d6d6d6
| 18384 ||  || — || March 8, 1992 || La Silla || UESAC || — || align=right | 8.5 km || 
|-id=385 bgcolor=#d6d6d6
| 18385 ||  || — || March 1, 1992 || La Silla || UESAC || EOS || align=right | 5.6 km || 
|-id=386 bgcolor=#fefefe
| 18386 ||  || — || March 2, 1992 || La Silla || UESAC || FLO || align=right | 2.5 km || 
|-id=387 bgcolor=#fefefe
| 18387 ||  || — || April 4, 1992 || La Silla || E. W. Elst || NYS || align=right | 3.1 km || 
|-id=388 bgcolor=#fefefe
| 18388 ||  || — || April 4, 1992 || La Silla || E. W. Elst || FLO || align=right | 3.4 km || 
|-id=389 bgcolor=#fefefe
| 18389 ||  || — || May 4, 1992 || La Silla || H. Debehogne || — || align=right | 3.6 km || 
|-id=390 bgcolor=#fefefe
| 18390 ||  || — || May 7, 1992 || La Silla || H. Debehogne || FLO || align=right | 5.3 km || 
|-id=391 bgcolor=#fefefe
| 18391 ||  || — || August 8, 1992 || Caussols || E. W. Elst || — || align=right | 2.6 km || 
|-id=392 bgcolor=#fefefe
| 18392 ||  || — || August 2, 1992 || Palomar || H. E. Holt || — || align=right | 4.0 km || 
|-id=393 bgcolor=#fefefe
| 18393 || 1992 QB || — || August 19, 1992 || Siding Spring || R. H. McNaught || PHO || align=right | 3.9 km || 
|-id=394 bgcolor=#fefefe
| 18394 ||  || — || September 2, 1992 || La Silla || E. W. Elst || — || align=right | 4.5 km || 
|-id=395 bgcolor=#fefefe
| 18395 Schmiedmayer ||  ||  || September 21, 1992 || Tautenburg Observatory || L. D. Schmadel, F. Börngen || — || align=right | 4.5 km || 
|-id=396 bgcolor=#fefefe
| 18396 Nellysachs ||  ||  || September 21, 1992 || Tautenburg Observatory || F. Börngen, L. D. Schmadel || NYS || align=right | 2.8 km || 
|-id=397 bgcolor=#E9E9E9
| 18397 ||  || — || September 28, 1992 || Palomar || H. E. Holt || — || align=right | 6.0 km || 
|-id=398 bgcolor=#FA8072
| 18398 Bregenz ||  ||  || September 23, 1992 || Tautenburg Observatory || F. Börngen || — || align=right | 3.0 km || 
|-id=399 bgcolor=#d6d6d6
| 18399 Tentoumushi ||  ||  || November 17, 1992 || Kitami || K. Endate, K. Watanabe || TIR || align=right | 23 km || 
|-id=400 bgcolor=#E9E9E9
| 18400 Muramatsushigeru ||  ||  || November 25, 1992 || Geisei || T. Seki || — || align=right | 4.4 km || 
|}

18401–18500 

|-bgcolor=#E9E9E9
| 18401 ||  || — || November 21, 1992 || Kushiro || S. Ueda, H. Kaneda || — || align=right | 4.5 km || 
|-id=402 bgcolor=#E9E9E9
| 18402 ||  || — || December 26, 1992 || Oohira || T. Urata || — || align=right | 3.4 km || 
|-id=403 bgcolor=#E9E9E9
| 18403 Atsuhirotaisei || 1993 AG ||  || January 13, 1993 || Kitami || K. Endate, K. Watanabe || — || align=right | 2.7 km || 
|-id=404 bgcolor=#E9E9E9
| 18404 Kenichi ||  ||  || March 20, 1993 || Kitami || K. Endate, K. Watanabe || — || align=right | 7.3 km || 
|-id=405 bgcolor=#d6d6d6
| 18405 ||  || — || March 17, 1993 || La Silla || UESAC || 615 || align=right | 7.7 km || 
|-id=406 bgcolor=#E9E9E9
| 18406 ||  || — || March 17, 1993 || La Silla || UESAC || — || align=right | 3.0 km || 
|-id=407 bgcolor=#E9E9E9
| 18407 ||  || — || March 21, 1993 || La Silla || UESAC || — || align=right | 4.3 km || 
|-id=408 bgcolor=#d6d6d6
| 18408 ||  || — || March 21, 1993 || La Silla || UESAC || — || align=right | 9.7 km || 
|-id=409 bgcolor=#fefefe
| 18409 ||  || — || March 19, 1993 || La Silla || UESAC || — || align=right | 1.6 km || 
|-id=410 bgcolor=#d6d6d6
| 18410 ||  || — || March 19, 1993 || La Silla || UESAC || KOR || align=right | 4.2 km || 
|-id=411 bgcolor=#d6d6d6
| 18411 ||  || — || March 19, 1993 || La Silla || UESAC || — || align=right | 8.7 km || 
|-id=412 bgcolor=#d6d6d6
| 18412 Kruszelnicki || 1993 LX ||  || June 13, 1993 || Siding Spring || R. H. McNaught || — || align=right | 6.1 km || 
|-id=413 bgcolor=#d6d6d6
| 18413 Adamspencer ||  ||  || June 13, 1993 || Siding Spring || R. H. McNaught || — || align=right | 5.9 km || 
|-id=414 bgcolor=#fefefe
| 18414 ||  || — || July 20, 1993 || La Silla || E. W. Elst || — || align=right | 4.0 km || 
|-id=415 bgcolor=#fefefe
| 18415 ||  || — || August 15, 1993 || Caussols || E. W. Elst || — || align=right | 3.1 km || 
|-id=416 bgcolor=#fefefe
| 18416 || 1993 QW || — || August 22, 1993 || Palomar || E. F. Helin || — || align=right | 2.1 km || 
|-id=417 bgcolor=#fefefe
| 18417 ||  || — || August 20, 1993 || La Silla || E. W. Elst || — || align=right | 1.6 km || 
|-id=418 bgcolor=#fefefe
| 18418 Ujibe ||  ||  || October 15, 1993 || Kitami || K. Endate, K. Watanabe || — || align=right | 3.4 km || 
|-id=419 bgcolor=#fefefe
| 18419 ||  || — || October 9, 1993 || La Silla || E. W. Elst || — || align=right | 6.2 km || 
|-id=420 bgcolor=#fefefe
| 18420 ||  || — || October 9, 1993 || La Silla || E. W. Elst || NYS || align=right | 4.4 km || 
|-id=421 bgcolor=#fefefe
| 18421 ||  || — || October 9, 1993 || La Silla || E. W. Elst || — || align=right | 3.0 km || 
|-id=422 bgcolor=#fefefe
| 18422 ||  || — || October 20, 1993 || La Silla || E. W. Elst || FLO || align=right | 3.9 km || 
|-id=423 bgcolor=#fefefe
| 18423 ||  || — || October 20, 1993 || La Silla || E. W. Elst || FLO || align=right | 2.8 km || 
|-id=424 bgcolor=#fefefe
| 18424 || 1993 YG || — || December 17, 1993 || Oizumi || T. Kobayashi || NYS || align=right | 5.6 km || 
|-id=425 bgcolor=#fefefe
| 18425 || 1993 YL || — || December 18, 1993 || Oizumi || T. Kobayashi || NYS || align=right | 3.9 km || 
|-id=426 bgcolor=#fefefe
| 18426 Maffei ||  ||  || December 18, 1993 || Sormano || E. Colzani, G. Ventre || — || align=right | 2.6 km || 
|-id=427 bgcolor=#fefefe
| 18427 || 1994 AY || — || January 4, 1994 || Oizumi || T. Kobayashi || NYS || align=right | 2.3 km || 
|-id=428 bgcolor=#fefefe
| 18428 ||  || — || January 7, 1994 || Oizumi || T. Kobayashi || — || align=right | 2.6 km || 
|-id=429 bgcolor=#fefefe
| 18429 ||  || — || January 8, 1994 || Dynic || A. Sugie || — || align=right | 10 km || 
|-id=430 bgcolor=#fefefe
| 18430 Balzac ||  ||  || January 14, 1994 || Tautenburg Observatory || F. Börngen || — || align=right | 3.6 km || 
|-id=431 bgcolor=#fefefe
| 18431 Stazzema || 1994 BM ||  || January 16, 1994 || Cima Ekar || M. Tombelli, A. Boattini || V || align=right | 3.1 km || 
|-id=432 bgcolor=#E9E9E9
| 18432 ||  || — || February 13, 1994 || Oizumi || T. Kobayashi || RAF || align=right | 3.4 km || 
|-id=433 bgcolor=#E9E9E9
| 18433 || 1994 EQ || — || March 4, 1994 || Oizumi || T. Kobayashi || — || align=right | 4.6 km || 
|-id=434 bgcolor=#fefefe
| 18434 Mikesandras ||  ||  || March 12, 1994 || Palomar || C. S. Shoemaker, D. H. Levy || PHO || align=right | 4.6 km || 
|-id=435 bgcolor=#fefefe
| 18435 ||  || — || April 14, 1994 || Palomar || PCAS || — || align=right | 3.8 km || 
|-id=436 bgcolor=#E9E9E9
| 18436 ||  || — || April 14, 1994 || Palomar || PCAS || RAF || align=right | 7.5 km || 
|-id=437 bgcolor=#E9E9E9
| 18437 || 1994 JR || — || May 5, 1994 || Palomar || E. F. Helin || EUN || align=right | 5.8 km || 
|-id=438 bgcolor=#E9E9E9
| 18438 ||  || — || May 4, 1994 || Kitt Peak || Spacewatch || — || align=right | 6.8 km || 
|-id=439 bgcolor=#E9E9E9
| 18439 ||  || — || June 9, 1994 || Palomar || E. F. Helin || — || align=right | 11 km || 
|-id=440 bgcolor=#d6d6d6
| 18440 ||  || — || July 8, 1994 || Caussols || E. W. Elst || — || align=right | 4.2 km || 
|-id=441 bgcolor=#d6d6d6
| 18441 Cittadivinci || 1994 PE ||  || August 5, 1994 || San Marcello || A. Boattini, M. Tombelli || — || align=right | 6.0 km || 
|-id=442 bgcolor=#d6d6d6
| 18442 ||  || — || August 10, 1994 || La Silla || E. W. Elst || — || align=right | 9.7 km || 
|-id=443 bgcolor=#d6d6d6
| 18443 ||  || — || August 10, 1994 || La Silla || E. W. Elst || EOS || align=right | 4.8 km || 
|-id=444 bgcolor=#d6d6d6
| 18444 ||  || — || August 10, 1994 || La Silla || E. W. Elst || — || align=right | 8.9 km || 
|-id=445 bgcolor=#d6d6d6
| 18445 ||  || — || August 10, 1994 || La Silla || E. W. Elst || — || align=right | 7.9 km || 
|-id=446 bgcolor=#d6d6d6
| 18446 ||  || — || August 10, 1994 || La Silla || E. W. Elst || — || align=right | 8.2 km || 
|-id=447 bgcolor=#d6d6d6
| 18447 ||  || — || August 10, 1994 || La Silla || E. W. Elst || — || align=right | 7.1 km || 
|-id=448 bgcolor=#d6d6d6
| 18448 ||  || — || August 10, 1994 || La Silla || E. W. Elst || — || align=right | 7.0 km || 
|-id=449 bgcolor=#d6d6d6
| 18449 Rikwouters ||  ||  || August 12, 1994 || La Silla || E. W. Elst || — || align=right | 10 km || 
|-id=450 bgcolor=#d6d6d6
| 18450 ||  || — || August 12, 1994 || La Silla || E. W. Elst || — || align=right | 8.0 km || 
|-id=451 bgcolor=#d6d6d6
| 18451 ||  || — || August 12, 1994 || La Silla || E. W. Elst || — || align=right | 8.3 km || 
|-id=452 bgcolor=#d6d6d6
| 18452 ||  || — || August 10, 1994 || La Silla || E. W. Elst || HYG || align=right | 7.0 km || 
|-id=453 bgcolor=#E9E9E9
| 18453 Nishiyamayukio || 1994 TT ||  || October 2, 1994 || Kitami || K. Endate, K. Watanabe || — || align=right | 3.7 km || 
|-id=454 bgcolor=#fefefe
| 18454 ||  || — || January 23, 1995 || Kiyosato || S. Otomo || FLO || align=right | 3.3 km || 
|-id=455 bgcolor=#fefefe
| 18455 || 1995 DF || — || February 20, 1995 || Oizumi || T. Kobayashi || — || align=right | 2.6 km || 
|-id=456 bgcolor=#fefefe
| 18456 Mišík || 1995 ES ||  || March 8, 1995 || Kleť || M. Tichý, J. Tichá || — || align=right | 2.6 km || 
|-id=457 bgcolor=#fefefe
| 18457 ||  || — || March 5, 1995 || Nyukasa || M. Hirasawa, S. Suzuki || — || align=right | 3.1 km || 
|-id=458 bgcolor=#fefefe
| 18458 Caesar ||  ||  || March 5, 1995 || Tautenburg Observatory || F. Börngen || FLO || align=right | 2.4 km || 
|-id=459 bgcolor=#fefefe
| 18459 ||  || — || March 28, 1995 || Kushiro || S. Ueda, H. Kaneda || NYS || align=right | 3.7 km || 
|-id=460 bgcolor=#E9E9E9
| 18460 Pecková || 1995 PG ||  || August 5, 1995 || Ondřejov || L. Kotková || — || align=right | 3.2 km || 
|-id=461 bgcolor=#E9E9E9
| 18461 Seiichikanno || 1995 QQ ||  || August 17, 1995 || Nanyo || T. Okuni || MAR || align=right | 6.5 km || 
|-id=462 bgcolor=#d6d6d6
| 18462 Riccò ||  ||  || August 26, 1995 || Bologna || San Vittore Obs. || KOR || align=right | 3.9 km || 
|-id=463 bgcolor=#d6d6d6
| 18463 ||  || — || September 18, 1995 || Kitt Peak || Spacewatch || — || align=right | 5.9 km || 
|-id=464 bgcolor=#E9E9E9
| 18464 ||  || — || September 19, 1995 || Kitt Peak || Spacewatch || GEF || align=right | 3.9 km || 
|-id=465 bgcolor=#E9E9E9
| 18465 ||  || — || September 22, 1995 || Kitt Peak || Spacewatch || HOF || align=right | 7.7 km || 
|-id=466 bgcolor=#E9E9E9
| 18466 ||  || — || September 24, 1995 || Kitt Peak || Spacewatch || INO || align=right | 3.4 km || 
|-id=467 bgcolor=#E9E9E9
| 18467 Nagatatsu ||  ||  || September 22, 1995 || Kitami || K. Endate, K. Watanabe || — || align=right | 6.2 km || 
|-id=468 bgcolor=#E9E9E9
| 18468 ||  || — || October 27, 1995 || Oizumi || T. Kobayashi || — || align=right | 7.1 km || 
|-id=469 bgcolor=#d6d6d6
| 18469 Hakodate ||  ||  || October 20, 1995 || Chichibu || N. Satō, T. Urata || KOR || align=right | 4.0 km || 
|-id=470 bgcolor=#d6d6d6
| 18470 ||  || — || October 27, 1995 || Kushiro || S. Ueda, H. Kaneda || KOR || align=right | 4.4 km || 
|-id=471 bgcolor=#E9E9E9
| 18471 ||  || — || October 20, 1995 || Caussols || E. W. Elst || — || align=right | 9.6 km || 
|-id=472 bgcolor=#d6d6d6
| 18472 Hatada ||  ||  || November 12, 1995 || Kitami || K. Endate, K. Watanabe || — || align=right | 6.8 km || 
|-id=473 bgcolor=#E9E9E9
| 18473 Kikuchijun ||  ||  || November 15, 1995 || Kitami || K. Endate, K. Watanabe || — || align=right | 4.4 km || 
|-id=474 bgcolor=#d6d6d6
| 18474 ||  || — || November 18, 1995 || Nachi-Katsuura || Y. Shimizu, T. Urata || — || align=right | 10 km || 
|-id=475 bgcolor=#d6d6d6
| 18475 ||  || — || November 27, 1995 || Oizumi || T. Kobayashi || TEL || align=right | 5.8 km || 
|-id=476 bgcolor=#d6d6d6
| 18476 ||  || — || November 27, 1995 || Oizumi || T. Kobayashi || VER || align=right | 9.8 km || 
|-id=477 bgcolor=#d6d6d6
| 18477 ||  || — || November 16, 1995 || Kitt Peak || Spacewatch || LIX || align=right | 11 km || 
|-id=478 bgcolor=#d6d6d6
| 18478 ||  || — || November 17, 1995 || Kitt Peak || Spacewatch || KOR || align=right | 5.6 km || 
|-id=479 bgcolor=#d6d6d6
| 18479 || 1995 XR || — || December 12, 1995 || Oizumi || T. Kobayashi || EOS || align=right | 8.4 km || 
|-id=480 bgcolor=#E9E9E9
| 18480 || 1995 YB || — || December 17, 1995 || Oizumi || T. Kobayashi || — || align=right | 4.6 km || 
|-id=481 bgcolor=#d6d6d6
| 18481 || 1995 YH || — || December 17, 1995 || Oizumi || T. Kobayashi || EOS || align=right | 11 km || 
|-id=482 bgcolor=#d6d6d6
| 18482 || 1995 YO || — || December 19, 1995 || Oizumi || T. Kobayashi || VER || align=right | 14 km || 
|-id=483 bgcolor=#d6d6d6
| 18483 ||  || — || December 26, 1995 || Oizumi || T. Kobayashi || LIX || align=right | 15 km || 
|-id=484 bgcolor=#d6d6d6
| 18484 ||  || — || December 27, 1995 || Haleakala || NEAT || THM || align=right | 9.9 km || 
|-id=485 bgcolor=#d6d6d6
| 18485 || 1996 AB || — || January 1, 1996 || Oizumi || T. Kobayashi || — || align=right | 13 km || 
|-id=486 bgcolor=#d6d6d6
| 18486 ||  || — || January 13, 1996 || Oizumi || T. Kobayashi || THM || align=right | 9.0 km || 
|-id=487 bgcolor=#E9E9E9
| 18487 ||  || — || January 13, 1996 || Kushiro || S. Ueda, H. Kaneda || — || align=right | 7.1 km || 
|-id=488 bgcolor=#d6d6d6
| 18488 ||  || — || January 13, 1996 || Chichibu || N. Satō, T. Urata || — || align=right | 25 km || 
|-id=489 bgcolor=#E9E9E9
| 18489 ||  || — || January 26, 1996 || Kashihara || F. Uto || — || align=right | 6.1 km || 
|-id=490 bgcolor=#E9E9E9
| 18490 ||  || — || January 24, 1996 || Socorro || Lincoln Lab ETS || DOR || align=right | 9.1 km || 
|-id=491 bgcolor=#fefefe
| 18491 ||  || — || February 23, 1996 || Oizumi || T. Kobayashi || — || align=right | 3.1 km || 
|-id=492 bgcolor=#fefefe
| 18492 ||  || — || April 8, 1996 || Xinglong || SCAP || — || align=right | 2.6 km || 
|-id=493 bgcolor=#C2FFFF
| 18493 Demoleon ||  ||  || April 17, 1996 || La Silla || E. W. Elst || L5 || align=right | 33 km || 
|-id=494 bgcolor=#fefefe
| 18494 ||  || — || April 17, 1996 || La Silla || E. W. Elst || — || align=right | 1.9 km || 
|-id=495 bgcolor=#fefefe
| 18495 ||  || — || April 20, 1996 || La Silla || E. W. Elst || — || align=right | 3.2 km || 
|-id=496 bgcolor=#fefefe
| 18496 ||  || — || May 9, 1996 || Siding Spring || R. H. McNaught || NYS || align=right | 2.7 km || 
|-id=497 bgcolor=#fefefe
| 18497 Nevězice ||  ||  || June 11, 1996 || Kleť || M. Tichý, Z. Moravec || V || align=right | 3.3 km || 
|-id=498 bgcolor=#fefefe
| 18498 Cesaro || 1996 MN ||  || June 22, 1996 || Prescott || P. G. Comba || V || align=right | 2.6 km || 
|-id=499 bgcolor=#FA8072
| 18499 Showalter || 1996 MR ||  || June 22, 1996 || Haleakala || NEAT || — || align=right | 2.0 km || 
|-id=500 bgcolor=#fefefe
| 18500 ||  || — || July 14, 1996 || La Silla || E. W. Elst || — || align=right | 4.2 km || 
|}

18501–18600 

|-bgcolor=#fefefe
| 18501 Luria || 1996 OB ||  || July 16, 1996 || Farra d'Isonzo || Farra d'Isonzo || — || align=right | 2.8 km || 
|-id=502 bgcolor=#fefefe
| 18502 ||  || — || August 11, 1996 || Rand || G. R. Viscome || NYS || align=right | 1.4 km || 
|-id=503 bgcolor=#fefefe
| 18503 ||  || — || August 15, 1996 || Haleakala || NEAT || PHOmoon || align=right | 3.5 km || 
|-id=504 bgcolor=#fefefe
| 18504 ||  || — || August 15, 1996 || Haleakala || NEAT || — || align=right | 3.1 km || 
|-id=505 bgcolor=#fefefe
| 18505 Caravelli ||  ||  || August 9, 1996 || Bologna || San Vittore Obs. || FLO || align=right | 2.5 km || 
|-id=506 bgcolor=#fefefe
| 18506 ||  || — || August 15, 1996 || Macquarie || R. H. McNaught, J. B. Child || PHO || align=right | 3.9 km || 
|-id=507 bgcolor=#fefefe
| 18507 ||  || — || August 18, 1996 || Lake Clear || K. A. Williams || — || align=right | 3.2 km || 
|-id=508 bgcolor=#fefefe
| 18508 ||  || — || September 8, 1996 || Haleakala || NEAT || V || align=right | 2.3 km || 
|-id=509 bgcolor=#E9E9E9
| 18509 Bellini ||  ||  || September 14, 1996 || Colleverde || V. S. Casulli || EUN || align=right | 5.3 km || 
|-id=510 bgcolor=#E9E9E9
| 18510 Chasles || 1996 SN ||  || September 16, 1996 || Prescott || P. G. Comba || MIS || align=right | 5.5 km || 
|-id=511 bgcolor=#E9E9E9
| 18511 ||  || — || September 19, 1996 || Xinglong || SCAP || BRU || align=right | 6.2 km || 
|-id=512 bgcolor=#fefefe
| 18512 ||  || — || September 17, 1996 || Kiyosato || S. Otomo || NYS || align=right | 3.6 km || 
|-id=513 bgcolor=#fefefe
| 18513 ||  || — || October 7, 1996 || Catalina Station || T. B. Spahr || PHO || align=right | 4.1 km || 
|-id=514 bgcolor=#FA8072
| 18514 ||  || — || October 14, 1996 || Siding Spring || R. H. McNaught || — || align=right | 1.9 km || 
|-id=515 bgcolor=#E9E9E9
| 18515 ||  || — || October 9, 1996 || Kushiro || S. Ueda, H. Kaneda || — || align=right | 9.6 km || 
|-id=516 bgcolor=#fefefe
| 18516 ||  || — || October 7, 1996 || Kitt Peak || Spacewatch || — || align=right | 3.4 km || 
|-id=517 bgcolor=#fefefe
| 18517 ||  || — || November 6, 1996 || Oizumi || T. Kobayashi || NYS || align=right | 3.0 km || 
|-id=518 bgcolor=#E9E9E9
| 18518 ||  || — || November 2, 1996 || Xinglong || SCAP || — || align=right | 8.3 km || 
|-id=519 bgcolor=#E9E9E9
| 18519 ||  || — || November 8, 1996 || Xinglong || SCAP || EUN || align=right | 4.9 km || 
|-id=520 bgcolor=#E9E9E9
| 18520 Wolfratshausen ||  ||  || November 6, 1996 || Chichibu || N. Satō || — || align=right | 5.1 km || 
|-id=521 bgcolor=#E9E9E9
| 18521 ||  || — || November 14, 1996 || Oizumi || T. Kobayashi || — || align=right | 6.5 km || 
|-id=522 bgcolor=#E9E9E9
| 18522 ||  || — || November 15, 1996 || Oizumi || T. Kobayashi || EUN || align=right | 3.7 km || 
|-id=523 bgcolor=#E9E9E9
| 18523 ||  || — || November 2, 1996 || Xinglong || SCAP || — || align=right | 3.8 km || 
|-id=524 bgcolor=#fefefe
| 18524 Tagatoshihiro ||  ||  || November 6, 1996 || Kitami || K. Endate, K. Watanabe || — || align=right | 4.6 km || 
|-id=525 bgcolor=#fefefe
| 18525 ||  || — || November 7, 1996 || Kushiro || S. Ueda, H. Kaneda || NYS || align=right | 3.0 km || 
|-id=526 bgcolor=#fefefe
| 18526 ||  || — || November 7, 1996 || Kushiro || S. Ueda, H. Kaneda || NYS || align=right | 4.0 km || 
|-id=527 bgcolor=#fefefe
| 18527 ||  || — || November 7, 1996 || Kushiro || S. Ueda, H. Kaneda || Vmoon || align=right | 3.3 km || 
|-id=528 bgcolor=#E9E9E9
| 18528 ||  || — || November 2, 1996 || Xinglong || SCAP || — || align=right | 3.0 km || 
|-id=529 bgcolor=#fefefe
| 18529 ||  || — || November 28, 1996 || Xinglong || SCAP || — || align=right | 3.2 km || 
|-id=530 bgcolor=#E9E9E9
| 18530 ||  || — || December 2, 1996 || Oizumi || T. Kobayashi || — || align=right | 7.7 km || 
|-id=531 bgcolor=#fefefe
| 18531 Strakonice ||  ||  || December 4, 1996 || Kleť || M. Tichý, Z. Moravec || — || align=right | 2.9 km || 
|-id=532 bgcolor=#E9E9E9
| 18532 ||  || — || December 3, 1996 || Oizumi || T. Kobayashi || EUN || align=right | 3.9 km || 
|-id=533 bgcolor=#fefefe
| 18533 ||  || — || December 3, 1996 || Nachi-Katsuura || Y. Shimizu, T. Urata || — || align=right | 3.9 km || 
|-id=534 bgcolor=#d6d6d6
| 18534 ||  || — || December 4, 1996 || Kitt Peak || Spacewatch || KOR || align=right | 3.9 km || 
|-id=535 bgcolor=#E9E9E9
| 18535 ||  || — || December 9, 1996 || Kleť || Kleť Obs. || — || align=right | 7.9 km || 
|-id=536 bgcolor=#E9E9E9
| 18536 ||  || — || December 10, 1996 || Xinglong || SCAP || — || align=right | 6.5 km || 
|-id=537 bgcolor=#E9E9E9
| 18537 ||  || — || December 7, 1996 || Kitt Peak || Spacewatch || — || align=right | 10 km || 
|-id=538 bgcolor=#fefefe
| 18538 ||  || — || December 6, 1996 || Nachi-Katsuura || Y. Shimizu, T. Urata || — || align=right | 5.7 km || 
|-id=539 bgcolor=#E9E9E9
| 18539 ||  || — || December 14, 1996 || Oizumi || T. Kobayashi || — || align=right | 3.6 km || 
|-id=540 bgcolor=#E9E9E9
| 18540 ||  || — || December 14, 1996 || Oizumi || T. Kobayashi || — || align=right | 4.8 km || 
|-id=541 bgcolor=#d6d6d6
| 18541 ||  || — || December 20, 1996 || Oizumi || T. Kobayashi || KOR || align=right | 3.5 km || 
|-id=542 bgcolor=#E9E9E9
| 18542 Broglio ||  ||  || December 29, 1996 || Sormano || A. Testa, F. Manca || — || align=right | 4.5 km || 
|-id=543 bgcolor=#E9E9E9
| 18543 || 1997 AE || — || January 2, 1997 || Oizumi || T. Kobayashi || — || align=right | 5.6 km || 
|-id=544 bgcolor=#E9E9E9
| 18544 ||  || — || January 3, 1997 || Oizumi || T. Kobayashi || — || align=right | 6.7 km || 
|-id=545 bgcolor=#d6d6d6
| 18545 ||  || — || January 3, 1997 || Oizumi || T. Kobayashi || EOS || align=right | 8.1 km || 
|-id=546 bgcolor=#fefefe
| 18546 ||  || — || January 6, 1997 || Oizumi || T. Kobayashi || NYS || align=right | 4.3 km || 
|-id=547 bgcolor=#d6d6d6
| 18547 ||  || — || January 7, 1997 || Oizumi || T. Kobayashi || EOS || align=right | 7.9 km || 
|-id=548 bgcolor=#E9E9E9
| 18548 Christoffel ||  ||  || January 10, 1997 || Prescott || P. G. Comba || — || align=right | 4.1 km || 
|-id=549 bgcolor=#E9E9E9
| 18549 ||  || — || January 11, 1997 || Oizumi || T. Kobayashi || — || align=right | 5.1 km || 
|-id=550 bgcolor=#d6d6d6
| 18550 Maoyisheng ||  ||  || January 9, 1997 || Xinglong || SCAP || — || align=right | 9.3 km || 
|-id=551 bgcolor=#E9E9E9
| 18551 Bovet ||  ||  || January 13, 1997 || Farra d'Isonzo || Farra d'Isonzo || — || align=right | 6.9 km || 
|-id=552 bgcolor=#E9E9E9
| 18552 ||  || — || January 13, 1997 || Nachi-Katsuura || Y. Shimizu, T. Urata || GEF || align=right | 4.9 km || 
|-id=553 bgcolor=#d6d6d6
| 18553 Kinkakuji ||  ||  || January 6, 1997 || Chichibu || N. Satō || THM || align=right | 9.9 km || 
|-id=554 bgcolor=#d6d6d6
| 18554 ||  || — || January 29, 1997 || Oizumi || T. Kobayashi || — || align=right | 11 km || 
|-id=555 bgcolor=#d6d6d6
| 18555 Courant ||  ||  || February 4, 1997 || Prescott || P. G. Comba || KOR || align=right | 4.3 km || 
|-id=556 bgcolor=#d6d6d6
| 18556 Battiato ||  ||  || February 7, 1997 || Sormano || P. Sicoli, F. Manca || — || align=right | 6.2 km || 
|-id=557 bgcolor=#d6d6d6
| 18557 ||  || — || February 3, 1997 || Kitt Peak || Spacewatch || KOR || align=right | 5.2 km || 
|-id=558 bgcolor=#d6d6d6
| 18558 ||  || — || February 6, 1997 || Oohira || T. Urata || HYG || align=right | 8.4 km || 
|-id=559 bgcolor=#d6d6d6
| 18559 ||  || — || March 4, 1997 || Oizumi || T. Kobayashi || — || align=right | 12 km || 
|-id=560 bgcolor=#d6d6d6
| 18560 Coxeter ||  ||  || March 7, 1997 || Prescott || P. G. Comba || — || align=right | 18 km || 
|-id=561 bgcolor=#d6d6d6
| 18561 Fengningding ||  ||  || March 4, 1997 || Socorro || LINEAR || KOR || align=right | 4.3 km || 
|-id=562 bgcolor=#d6d6d6
| 18562 Ellenkey ||  ||  || March 8, 1997 || La Silla || E. W. Elst || — || align=right | 12 km || 
|-id=563 bgcolor=#d6d6d6
| 18563 Danigoldman ||  ||  || March 31, 1997 || Socorro || LINEAR || — || align=right | 10 km || 
|-id=564 bgcolor=#d6d6d6
| 18564 Caseyo ||  ||  || April 2, 1997 || Socorro || LINEAR || THM || align=right | 8.9 km || 
|-id=565 bgcolor=#d6d6d6
| 18565 Selg ||  ||  || April 6, 1997 || Socorro || LINEAR || — || align=right | 8.6 km || 
|-id=566 bgcolor=#d6d6d6
| 18566 ||  || — || September 1, 1997 || Caussols || ODAS || — || align=right | 9.6 km || 
|-id=567 bgcolor=#E9E9E9
| 18567 Segenthau ||  ||  || September 27, 1997 || Starkenburg Observatory || Starkenburg Obs. || HOF || align=right | 8.6 km || 
|-id=568 bgcolor=#d6d6d6
| 18568 Thuillot ||  ||  || October 3, 1997 || Caussols || ODAS || ALA || align=right | 17 km || 
|-id=569 bgcolor=#fefefe
| 18569 ||  || — || October 26, 1997 || Oohira || T. Urata || — || align=right | 4.6 km || 
|-id=570 bgcolor=#fefefe
| 18570 ||  || — || November 9, 1997 || Oizumi || T. Kobayashi || — || align=right | 2.4 km || 
|-id=571 bgcolor=#fefefe
| 18571 ||  || — || November 30, 1997 || Oizumi || T. Kobayashi || — || align=right | 10 km || 
|-id=572 bgcolor=#fefefe
| 18572 Rocher ||  ||  || November 28, 1997 || Caussols || ODAS || — || align=right | 2.2 km || 
|-id=573 bgcolor=#d6d6d6
| 18573 ||  || — || November 28, 1997 || Caussols || ODAS || KOR || align=right | 4.7 km || 
|-id=574 bgcolor=#E9E9E9
| 18574 Jeansimon ||  ||  || November 28, 1997 || Caussols || ODAS || — || align=right | 6.6 km || 
|-id=575 bgcolor=#fefefe
| 18575 ||  || — || November 29, 1997 || Socorro || LINEAR || — || align=right | 2.2 km || 
|-id=576 bgcolor=#fefefe
| 18576 ||  || — || November 29, 1997 || Socorro || LINEAR || — || align=right | 2.8 km || 
|-id=577 bgcolor=#fefefe
| 18577 || 1997 XH || — || December 3, 1997 || Caussols || ODAS || FLO || align=right | 3.2 km || 
|-id=578 bgcolor=#fefefe
| 18578 || 1997 XP || — || December 3, 1997 || Oizumi || T. Kobayashi || — || align=right | 3.4 km || 
|-id=579 bgcolor=#E9E9E9
| 18579 Duongtuyenvu ||  ||  || December 5, 1997 || Caussols || ODAS || — || align=right | 5.6 km || 
|-id=580 bgcolor=#fefefe
| 18580 ||  || — || December 7, 1997 || Caussols || ODAS || — || align=right | 3.8 km || 
|-id=581 bgcolor=#fefefe
| 18581 Batllo ||  ||  || December 7, 1997 || Caussols || ODAS || V || align=right | 4.2 km || 
|-id=582 bgcolor=#fefefe
| 18582 ||  || — || December 4, 1997 || Xinglong || SCAP || Hslow || align=right | 4.6 km || 
|-id=583 bgcolor=#fefefe
| 18583 Francescopedani ||  ||  || December 7, 1997 || Cima Ekar || A. Boattini, M. Tombelli || NYS || align=right | 1.8 km || 
|-id=584 bgcolor=#fefefe
| 18584 ||  || — || December 21, 1997 || Oizumi || T. Kobayashi || — || align=right | 3.0 km || 
|-id=585 bgcolor=#fefefe
| 18585 ||  || — || December 21, 1997 || Oizumi || T. Kobayashi || — || align=right | 3.9 km || 
|-id=586 bgcolor=#fefefe
| 18586 ||  || — || December 24, 1997 || Oizumi || T. Kobayashi || — || align=right | 2.3 km || 
|-id=587 bgcolor=#fefefe
| 18587 ||  || — || December 25, 1997 || Oizumi || T. Kobayashi || — || align=right | 2.8 km || 
|-id=588 bgcolor=#fefefe
| 18588 ||  || — || December 25, 1997 || Haleakala || NEAT || V || align=right | 2.5 km || 
|-id=589 bgcolor=#fefefe
| 18589 ||  || — || December 28, 1997 || Oizumi || T. Kobayashi || — || align=right | 2.2 km || 
|-id=590 bgcolor=#fefefe
| 18590 ||  || — || December 28, 1997 || Oizumi || T. Kobayashi || FLO || align=right | 5.0 km || 
|-id=591 bgcolor=#E9E9E9
| 18591 ||  || — || December 30, 1997 || Oizumi || T. Kobayashi || — || align=right | 5.2 km || 
|-id=592 bgcolor=#fefefe
| 18592 ||  || — || December 24, 1997 || Xinglong || SCAP || — || align=right | 3.2 km || 
|-id=593 bgcolor=#fefefe
| 18593 Wangzhongcheng ||  ||  || January 5, 1998 || Xinglong || SCAP || — || align=right | 5.2 km || 
|-id=594 bgcolor=#fefefe
| 18594 || 1998 BJ || — || January 16, 1998 || Nachi-Katsuura || Y. Shimizu, T. Urata || — || align=right | 2.5 km || 
|-id=595 bgcolor=#fefefe
| 18595 ||  || — || January 19, 1998 || Oizumi || T. Kobayashi || ERI || align=right | 12 km || 
|-id=596 bgcolor=#fefefe
| 18596 Superbus ||  ||  || January 21, 1998 || Colleverde || V. S. Casulli || NYS || align=right | 3.3 km || 
|-id=597 bgcolor=#fefefe
| 18597 ||  || — || January 25, 1998 || Oizumi || T. Kobayashi || — || align=right | 3.0 km || 
|-id=598 bgcolor=#E9E9E9
| 18598 ||  || — || January 25, 1998 || Oizumi || T. Kobayashi || — || align=right | 8.9 km || 
|-id=599 bgcolor=#fefefe
| 18599 ||  || — || January 25, 1998 || Oizumi || T. Kobayashi || NYS || align=right | 2.8 km || 
|-id=600 bgcolor=#E9E9E9
| 18600 ||  || — || January 24, 1998 || Woomera || F. B. Zoltowski || — || align=right | 4.2 km || 
|}

18601–18700 

|-bgcolor=#fefefe
| 18601 Zafar ||  ||  || January 23, 1998 || Socorro || LINEAR || NYS || align=right | 3.0 km || 
|-id=602 bgcolor=#fefefe
| 18602 Lagillespie ||  ||  || January 23, 1998 || Socorro || LINEAR || NYS || align=right | 2.7 km || 
|-id=603 bgcolor=#fefefe
| 18603 ||  || — || January 28, 1998 || Oizumi || T. Kobayashi || FLO || align=right | 2.5 km || 
|-id=604 bgcolor=#fefefe
| 18604 ||  || — || January 28, 1998 || Caussols || ODAS || — || align=right | 2.3 km || 
|-id=605 bgcolor=#E9E9E9
| 18605 Jacqueslaskar ||  ||  || January 28, 1998 || Caussols || ODAS || — || align=right | 3.5 km || 
|-id=606 bgcolor=#fefefe
| 18606 ||  || — || January 31, 1998 || Oizumi || T. Kobayashi || — || align=right | 3.4 km || 
|-id=607 bgcolor=#fefefe
| 18607 ||  || — || January 31, 1998 || Oizumi || T. Kobayashi || FLO || align=right | 5.1 km || 
|-id=608 bgcolor=#fefefe
| 18608 ||  || — || January 25, 1998 || Kitt Peak || Spacewatch || NYS || align=right | 2.7 km || 
|-id=609 bgcolor=#fefefe
| 18609 Shinobuyama ||  ||  || January 30, 1998 || Geisei || T. Seki || — || align=right | 4.8 km || 
|-id=610 bgcolor=#E9E9E9
| 18610 Arthurdent ||  ||  || February 7, 1998 || Starkenburg Observatory || Starkenburg Obs. || — || align=right | 3.5 km || 
|-id=611 bgcolor=#fefefe
| 18611 Baudelaire ||  ||  || February 6, 1998 || La Silla || E. W. Elst || NYS || align=right | 6.5 km || 
|-id=612 bgcolor=#fefefe
| 18612 ||  || — || February 6, 1998 || La Silla || E. W. Elst || NYS || align=right | 4.1 km || 
|-id=613 bgcolor=#E9E9E9
| 18613 || 1998 DR || — || February 19, 1998 || Kleť || Kleť Obs. || — || align=right | 6.4 km || 
|-id=614 bgcolor=#E9E9E9
| 18614 ||  || — || February 20, 1998 || Caussols || ODAS || BRU || align=right | 9.5 km || 
|-id=615 bgcolor=#E9E9E9
| 18615 ||  || — || February 22, 1998 || Haleakala || NEAT || — || align=right | 6.8 km || 
|-id=616 bgcolor=#E9E9E9
| 18616 ||  || — || February 22, 1998 || Haleakala || NEAT || — || align=right | 13 km || 
|-id=617 bgcolor=#fefefe
| 18617 Puntel ||  ||  || February 24, 1998 || Les Tardieux Obs. || M. Boeuf || — || align=right | 2.9 km || 
|-id=618 bgcolor=#fefefe
| 18618 ||  || — || February 22, 1998 || Haleakala || NEAT || — || align=right | 4.5 km || 
|-id=619 bgcolor=#fefefe
| 18619 ||  || — || February 22, 1998 || Haleakala || NEAT || — || align=right | 3.2 km || 
|-id=620 bgcolor=#FA8072
| 18620 ||  || — || February 24, 1998 || Haleakala || NEAT || — || align=right | 1.7 km || 
|-id=621 bgcolor=#fefefe
| 18621 ||  || — || February 23, 1998 || Kitt Peak || Spacewatch || V || align=right | 1.9 km || 
|-id=622 bgcolor=#E9E9E9
| 18622 ||  || — || February 25, 1998 || Haleakala || NEAT || — || align=right | 7.5 km || 
|-id=623 bgcolor=#d6d6d6
| 18623 Pises ||  ||  || February 27, 1998 || Pises || Pises Obs. || KOR || align=right | 5.1 km || 
|-id=624 bgcolor=#d6d6d6
| 18624 Prévert ||  ||  || February 27, 1998 || Caussols || ODAS || — || align=right | 8.6 km || 
|-id=625 bgcolor=#fefefe
| 18625 ||  || — || February 27, 1998 || Caussols || ODAS || — || align=right | 2.4 km || 
|-id=626 bgcolor=#fefefe
| 18626 Michaelcarr ||  ||  || February 27, 1998 || Caussols || ODAS || H || align=right | 1.7 km || 
|-id=627 bgcolor=#fefefe
| 18627 Rogerbonnet ||  ||  || February 27, 1998 || Cima Ekar || M. Tombelli, C. Casacci || — || align=right | 5.0 km || 
|-id=628 bgcolor=#fefefe
| 18628 Taniasagrati ||  ||  || February 27, 1998 || Cima Ekar || G. Forti, M. Tombelli || FLO || align=right | 2.8 km || 
|-id=629 bgcolor=#E9E9E9
| 18629 ||  || — || February 27, 1998 || La Silla || E. W. Elst || — || align=right | 4.1 km || 
|-id=630 bgcolor=#fefefe
| 18630 ||  || — || February 27, 1998 || La Silla || E. W. Elst || FLO || align=right | 2.2 km || 
|-id=631 bgcolor=#E9E9E9
| 18631 Maurogherardini ||  ||  || February 27, 1998 || Cima Ekar || A. Boattini, M. Tombelli || EUN || align=right | 7.4 km || 
|-id=632 bgcolor=#d6d6d6
| 18632 Danielsson ||  ||  || February 28, 1998 || La Silla || C.-I. Lagerkvist || — || align=right | 6.9 km || 
|-id=633 bgcolor=#d6d6d6
| 18633 || 1998 EU || — || March 2, 1998 || Caussols || ODAS || — || align=right | 5.3 km || 
|-id=634 bgcolor=#E9E9E9
| 18634 Champigneulles ||  ||  || March 2, 1998 || Caussols || ODAS || — || align=right | 4.0 km || 
|-id=635 bgcolor=#E9E9E9
| 18635 Frouard ||  ||  || March 2, 1998 || Caussols || ODAS || — || align=right | 3.5 km || 
|-id=636 bgcolor=#d6d6d6
| 18636 Villedepompey ||  ||  || March 2, 1998 || Caussols || ODAS || KOR || align=right | 5.1 km || 
|-id=637 bgcolor=#E9E9E9
| 18637 Liverdun ||  ||  || March 2, 1998 || Caussols || ODAS || EUN || align=right | 2.9 km || 
|-id=638 bgcolor=#E9E9E9
| 18638 Nouet ||  ||  || March 2, 1998 || Caussols || ODAS || — || align=right | 8.7 km || 
|-id=639 bgcolor=#E9E9E9
| 18639 Aoyunzhiyuanzhe ||  ||  || March 5, 1998 || Xinglong || SCAP || — || align=right | 4.2 km || 
|-id=640 bgcolor=#fefefe
| 18640 ||  || — || March 7, 1998 || Xinglong || SCAP || PHO || align=right | 6.7 km || 
|-id=641 bgcolor=#fefefe
| 18641 ||  || — || March 6, 1998 || Gekko || T. Kagawa || — || align=right | 3.7 km || 
|-id=642 bgcolor=#fefefe
| 18642 ||  || — || March 1, 1998 || La Silla || E. W. Elst || — || align=right | 2.5 km || 
|-id=643 bgcolor=#E9E9E9
| 18643 van Rysselberghe ||  ||  || March 1, 1998 || La Silla || E. W. Elst || — || align=right | 5.8 km || 
|-id=644 bgcolor=#fefefe
| 18644 Arashiyama ||  ||  || March 2, 1998 || Geisei || T. Seki || — || align=right | 3.8 km || 
|-id=645 bgcolor=#d6d6d6
| 18645 ||  || — || March 3, 1998 || La Silla || E. W. Elst || THM || align=right | 10 km || 
|-id=646 bgcolor=#fefefe
| 18646 ||  || — || March 3, 1998 || La Silla || E. W. Elst || — || align=right | 4.4 km || 
|-id=647 bgcolor=#E9E9E9
| 18647 Václavhübner ||  ||  || March 21, 1998 || Ondřejov || P. Pravec || — || align=right | 2.7 km || 
|-id=648 bgcolor=#fefefe
| 18648 ||  || — || March 24, 1998 || Caussols || ODAS || — || align=right | 1.8 km || 
|-id=649 bgcolor=#E9E9E9
| 18649 Fabrega ||  ||  || March 24, 1998 || Caussols || ODAS || GEF || align=right | 4.0 km || 
|-id=650 bgcolor=#E9E9E9
| 18650 ||  || — || March 24, 1998 || Caussols || ODAS || WIT || align=right | 4.0 km || 
|-id=651 bgcolor=#fefefe
| 18651 ||  || — || March 22, 1998 || Nachi-Katsuura || Y. Shimizu, T. Urata || — || align=right | 4.0 km || 
|-id=652 bgcolor=#fefefe
| 18652 ||  || — || March 21, 1998 || Kushiro || S. Ueda, H. Kaneda || NYS || align=right | 3.8 km || 
|-id=653 bgcolor=#fefefe
| 18653 Christagünt ||  ||  || March 28, 1998 || Starkenburg Observatory || Starkenburg Obs. || — || align=right | 3.2 km || 
|-id=654 bgcolor=#E9E9E9
| 18654 ||  || — || March 20, 1998 || Socorro || LINEAR || — || align=right | 6.3 km || 
|-id=655 bgcolor=#E9E9E9
| 18655 ||  || — || March 20, 1998 || Socorro || LINEAR || — || align=right | 5.3 km || 
|-id=656 bgcolor=#fefefe
| 18656 Mergler ||  ||  || March 20, 1998 || Socorro || LINEAR || V || align=right | 4.3 km || 
|-id=657 bgcolor=#E9E9E9
| 18657 ||  || — || March 20, 1998 || Socorro || LINEAR || AGN || align=right | 5.5 km || 
|-id=658 bgcolor=#fefefe
| 18658 Rajdev ||  ||  || March 20, 1998 || Socorro || LINEAR || NYS || align=right | 2.2 km || 
|-id=659 bgcolor=#E9E9E9
| 18659 Megangross ||  ||  || March 20, 1998 || Socorro || LINEAR || — || align=right | 6.7 km || 
|-id=660 bgcolor=#E9E9E9
| 18660 ||  || — || March 20, 1998 || Socorro || LINEAR || — || align=right | 9.4 km || 
|-id=661 bgcolor=#fefefe
| 18661 Zoccoli ||  ||  || March 20, 1998 || Socorro || LINEAR || V || align=right | 2.1 km || 
|-id=662 bgcolor=#d6d6d6
| 18662 Erinwhite ||  ||  || March 20, 1998 || Socorro || LINEAR || KOR || align=right | 5.1 km || 
|-id=663 bgcolor=#fefefe
| 18663 Lynnta ||  ||  || March 20, 1998 || Socorro || LINEAR || V || align=right | 2.6 km || 
|-id=664 bgcolor=#d6d6d6
| 18664 Rafaelta ||  ||  || March 20, 1998 || Socorro || LINEAR || — || align=right | 5.2 km || 
|-id=665 bgcolor=#E9E9E9
| 18665 Sheenahayes ||  ||  || March 20, 1998 || Socorro || LINEAR || MIS || align=right | 3.9 km || 
|-id=666 bgcolor=#E9E9E9
| 18666 ||  || — || March 20, 1998 || Socorro || LINEAR || — || align=right | 7.3 km || 
|-id=667 bgcolor=#E9E9E9
| 18667 ||  || — || March 20, 1998 || Socorro || LINEAR || — || align=right | 7.6 km || 
|-id=668 bgcolor=#E9E9E9
| 18668 Gottesman ||  ||  || March 20, 1998 || Socorro || LINEAR || — || align=right | 7.3 km || 
|-id=669 bgcolor=#d6d6d6
| 18669 Lalitpatel ||  ||  || March 20, 1998 || Socorro || LINEAR || THM || align=right | 6.8 km || 
|-id=670 bgcolor=#d6d6d6
| 18670 Shantanugaur ||  ||  || March 20, 1998 || Socorro || LINEAR || THM || align=right | 7.3 km || 
|-id=671 bgcolor=#fefefe
| 18671 Zacharyrice ||  ||  || March 20, 1998 || Socorro || LINEAR || — || align=right | 5.1 km || 
|-id=672 bgcolor=#E9E9E9
| 18672 Ashleyamini ||  ||  || March 20, 1998 || Socorro || LINEAR || — || align=right | 4.0 km || 
|-id=673 bgcolor=#d6d6d6
| 18673 ||  || — || March 20, 1998 || Socorro || LINEAR || THM || align=right | 9.9 km || 
|-id=674 bgcolor=#d6d6d6
| 18674 ||  || — || March 20, 1998 || Socorro || LINEAR || EOS || align=right | 9.8 km || 
|-id=675 bgcolor=#E9E9E9
| 18675 Amiamini ||  ||  || March 20, 1998 || Socorro || LINEAR || — || align=right | 4.1 km || 
|-id=676 bgcolor=#E9E9E9
| 18676 Zdeňkaplavcová ||  ||  || March 30, 1998 || Ondřejov || P. Pravec || — || align=right | 2.8 km || 
|-id=677 bgcolor=#E9E9E9
| 18677 ||  || — || March 24, 1998 || Socorro || LINEAR || — || align=right | 6.8 km || 
|-id=678 bgcolor=#E9E9E9
| 18678 ||  || — || March 24, 1998 || Socorro || LINEAR || — || align=right | 9.9 km || 
|-id=679 bgcolor=#fefefe
| 18679 Heatherenae ||  ||  || March 31, 1998 || Socorro || LINEAR || FLO || align=right | 3.5 km || 
|-id=680 bgcolor=#fefefe
| 18680 Weirather ||  ||  || March 31, 1998 || Socorro || LINEAR || V || align=right | 2.9 km || 
|-id=681 bgcolor=#fefefe
| 18681 Caseylipp ||  ||  || March 31, 1998 || Socorro || LINEAR || V || align=right | 2.2 km || 
|-id=682 bgcolor=#d6d6d6
| 18682 ||  || — || March 31, 1998 || Socorro || LINEAR || EOS || align=right | 6.7 km || 
|-id=683 bgcolor=#d6d6d6
| 18683 ||  || — || March 31, 1998 || Socorro || LINEAR || — || align=right | 5.7 km || 
|-id=684 bgcolor=#d6d6d6
| 18684 ||  || — || March 31, 1998 || Socorro || LINEAR || EOS || align=right | 7.5 km || 
|-id=685 bgcolor=#E9E9E9
| 18685 ||  || — || March 31, 1998 || Socorro || LINEAR || EUN || align=right | 4.4 km || 
|-id=686 bgcolor=#E9E9E9
| 18686 ||  || — || March 20, 1998 || Socorro || LINEAR || AGN || align=right | 6.5 km || 
|-id=687 bgcolor=#d6d6d6
| 18687 ||  || — || March 20, 1998 || Socorro || LINEAR || EOS || align=right | 5.4 km || 
|-id=688 bgcolor=#d6d6d6
| 18688 ||  || — || March 20, 1998 || Socorro || LINEAR || — || align=right | 7.3 km || 
|-id=689 bgcolor=#d6d6d6
| 18689 Rodrick ||  ||  || March 24, 1998 || Socorro || LINEAR || KOR || align=right | 5.3 km || 
|-id=690 bgcolor=#d6d6d6
| 18690 ||  || — || April 2, 1998 || Socorro || LINEAR || — || align=right | 13 km || 
|-id=691 bgcolor=#d6d6d6
| 18691 ||  || — || April 17, 1998 || Xinglong || SCAP || — || align=right | 5.6 km || 
|-id=692 bgcolor=#d6d6d6
| 18692 ||  || — || April 22, 1998 || Haleakala || NEAT || — || align=right | 6.5 km || 
|-id=693 bgcolor=#fefefe
| 18693 ||  || — || April 29, 1998 || Haleakala || NEAT || — || align=right | 4.4 km || 
|-id=694 bgcolor=#E9E9E9
| 18694 ||  || — || April 23, 1998 || Višnjan Observatory || Višnjan Obs. || — || align=right | 8.7 km || 
|-id=695 bgcolor=#E9E9E9
| 18695 ||  || — || April 21, 1998 || Kitt Peak || Spacewatch || AGN || align=right | 4.6 km || 
|-id=696 bgcolor=#d6d6d6
| 18696 ||  || — || April 20, 1998 || Socorro || LINEAR || EOS || align=right | 6.3 km || 
|-id=697 bgcolor=#d6d6d6
| 18697 Kathanson ||  ||  || April 20, 1998 || Socorro || LINEAR || — || align=right | 5.4 km || 
|-id=698 bgcolor=#fefefe
| 18698 Racharles ||  ||  || April 20, 1998 || Socorro || LINEAR || — || align=right | 2.5 km || 
|-id=699 bgcolor=#E9E9E9
| 18699 Quigley ||  ||  || April 20, 1998 || Socorro || LINEAR || slow || align=right | 7.2 km || 
|-id=700 bgcolor=#d6d6d6
| 18700 ||  || — || April 21, 1998 || Socorro || LINEAR || EOS || align=right | 6.5 km || 
|}

18701–18800 

|-bgcolor=#d6d6d6
| 18701 ||  || — || April 21, 1998 || Socorro || LINEAR || — || align=right | 12 km || 
|-id=702 bgcolor=#E9E9E9
| 18702 Sadowski ||  ||  || April 21, 1998 || Socorro || LINEAR || — || align=right | 4.1 km || 
|-id=703 bgcolor=#d6d6d6
| 18703 ||  || — || April 21, 1998 || Socorro || LINEAR || HYG || align=right | 9.5 km || 
|-id=704 bgcolor=#d6d6d6
| 18704 Brychristian ||  ||  || April 21, 1998 || Socorro || LINEAR || — || align=right | 5.3 km || 
|-id=705 bgcolor=#d6d6d6
| 18705 ||  || — || April 21, 1998 || Socorro || LINEAR || THM || align=right | 9.7 km || 
|-id=706 bgcolor=#d6d6d6
| 18706 ||  || — || April 21, 1998 || Socorro || LINEAR || — || align=right | 8.8 km || 
|-id=707 bgcolor=#E9E9E9
| 18707 Annchi ||  ||  || April 21, 1998 || Socorro || LINEAR || — || align=right | 3.2 km || 
|-id=708 bgcolor=#d6d6d6
| 18708 Danielappel ||  ||  || April 21, 1998 || Socorro || LINEAR || — || align=right | 5.3 km || 
|-id=709 bgcolor=#E9E9E9
| 18709 Laurawong ||  ||  || April 21, 1998 || Socorro || LINEAR || — || align=right | 7.9 km || 
|-id=710 bgcolor=#E9E9E9
| 18710 ||  || — || April 21, 1998 || Socorro || LINEAR || VIB || align=right | 9.9 km || 
|-id=711 bgcolor=#E9E9E9
| 18711 ||  || — || April 21, 1998 || Socorro || LINEAR || EUN || align=right | 4.2 km || 
|-id=712 bgcolor=#E9E9E9
| 18712 ||  || — || April 23, 1998 || Socorro || LINEAR || DOR || align=right | 12 km || 
|-id=713 bgcolor=#d6d6d6
| 18713 ||  || — || April 23, 1998 || Socorro || LINEAR || EOS || align=right | 7.3 km || 
|-id=714 bgcolor=#d6d6d6
| 18714 ||  || — || April 23, 1998 || Socorro || LINEAR || — || align=right | 5.8 km || 
|-id=715 bgcolor=#d6d6d6
| 18715 ||  || — || April 23, 1998 || Socorro || LINEAR || — || align=right | 9.5 km || 
|-id=716 bgcolor=#d6d6d6
| 18716 ||  || — || April 23, 1998 || Socorro || LINEAR || EOS || align=right | 9.2 km || 
|-id=717 bgcolor=#d6d6d6
| 18717 ||  || — || April 18, 1998 || Socorro || LINEAR || THM || align=right | 6.8 km || 
|-id=718 bgcolor=#E9E9E9
| 18718 ||  || — || April 19, 1998 || Socorro || LINEAR || MAR || align=right | 5.6 km || 
|-id=719 bgcolor=#d6d6d6
| 18719 ||  || — || April 21, 1998 || Socorro || LINEAR || EOS || align=right | 7.6 km || 
|-id=720 bgcolor=#d6d6d6
| 18720 Jerryguo ||  ||  || April 21, 1998 || Socorro || LINEAR || LIX || align=right | 14 km || 
|-id=721 bgcolor=#d6d6d6
| 18721 ||  || — || April 21, 1998 || Socorro || LINEAR || — || align=right | 11 km || 
|-id=722 bgcolor=#d6d6d6
| 18722 ||  || — || April 25, 1998 || La Silla || E. W. Elst || — || align=right | 10 km || 
|-id=723 bgcolor=#d6d6d6
| 18723 ||  || — || May 1, 1998 || Haleakala || NEAT || THM || align=right | 12 km || 
|-id=724 bgcolor=#d6d6d6
| 18724 ||  || — || May 1, 1998 || Haleakala || NEAT || HYG || align=right | 15 km || 
|-id=725 bgcolor=#E9E9E9
| 18725 Atacama ||  ||  || May 2, 1998 || Caussols || ODAS || GEF || align=right | 6.0 km || 
|-id=726 bgcolor=#FA8072
| 18726 ||  || — || May 22, 1998 || Socorro || LINEAR || PHO || align=right | 2.6 km || 
|-id=727 bgcolor=#d6d6d6
| 18727 Peacock ||  ||  || May 22, 1998 || Anderson Mesa || LONEOS || HYG || align=right | 11 km || 
|-id=728 bgcolor=#E9E9E9
| 18728 Grammier ||  ||  || May 22, 1998 || Anderson Mesa || LONEOS || — || align=right | 4.8 km || 
|-id=729 bgcolor=#d6d6d6
| 18729 Potentino ||  ||  || May 22, 1998 || Anderson Mesa || LONEOS || KOR || align=right | 5.1 km || 
|-id=730 bgcolor=#d6d6d6
| 18730 Wingip ||  ||  || May 23, 1998 || Anderson Mesa || LONEOS || — || align=right | 8.9 km || 
|-id=731 bgcolor=#d6d6d6
| 18731 Vilʹbakirov ||  ||  || May 23, 1998 || Anderson Mesa || LONEOS || EOS || align=right | 9.8 km || 
|-id=732 bgcolor=#d6d6d6
| 18732 ||  || — || May 22, 1998 || Socorro || LINEAR || — || align=right | 16 km || 
|-id=733 bgcolor=#d6d6d6
| 18733 ||  || — || May 22, 1998 || Socorro || LINEAR || — || align=right | 10 km || 
|-id=734 bgcolor=#E9E9E9
| 18734 Darboux ||  ||  || June 20, 1998 || Prescott || P. G. Comba || — || align=right | 3.8 km || 
|-id=735 bgcolor=#d6d6d6
| 18735 Chubko ||  ||  || June 23, 1998 || Anderson Mesa || LONEOS || — || align=right | 9.5 km || 
|-id=736 bgcolor=#FFC2E0
| 18736 || 1998 NU || — || July 2, 1998 || Kitt Peak || Spacewatch || AMO +1km || align=right | 2.3 km || 
|-id=737 bgcolor=#fefefe
| 18737 Aliciaworley ||  ||  || August 24, 1998 || Socorro || LINEAR || — || align=right | 4.8 km || 
|-id=738 bgcolor=#E9E9E9
| 18738 ||  || — || September 23, 1998 || Višnjan Observatory || Višnjan Obs. || — || align=right | 4.5 km || 
|-id=739 bgcolor=#fefefe
| 18739 Larryhu ||  ||  || September 26, 1998 || Socorro || LINEAR || FLO || align=right | 2.7 km || 
|-id=740 bgcolor=#fefefe
| 18740 ||  || — || November 14, 1998 || Oizumi || T. Kobayashi || EUT || align=right | 3.0 km || 
|-id=741 bgcolor=#fefefe
| 18741 ||  || — || November 18, 1998 || Kushiro || S. Ueda, H. Kaneda || — || align=right | 4.6 km || 
|-id=742 bgcolor=#E9E9E9
| 18742 ||  || — || December 14, 1998 || Socorro || LINEAR || — || align=right | 5.8 km || 
|-id=743 bgcolor=#d6d6d6
| 18743 ||  || — || December 18, 1998 || Caussols || ODAS || — || align=right | 17 km || 
|-id=744 bgcolor=#fefefe
| 18744 || 1999 AU || — || January 7, 1999 || Oizumi || T. Kobayashi || — || align=right | 8.1 km || 
|-id=745 bgcolor=#E9E9E9
| 18745 San Pedro ||  ||  || January 23, 1999 || Caussols || ODAS || MAR || align=right | 5.6 km || 
|-id=746 bgcolor=#fefefe
| 18746 ||  || — || March 19, 1999 || Kitt Peak || Spacewatch || — || align=right | 2.2 km || 
|-id=747 bgcolor=#fefefe
| 18747 Lexcen ||  ||  || March 26, 1999 || Reedy Creek || J. Broughton || — || align=right | 3.5 km || 
|-id=748 bgcolor=#fefefe
| 18748 || 1999 GV || — || April 5, 1999 || Višnjan Observatory || K. Korlević || — || align=right | 4.2 km || 
|-id=749 bgcolor=#fefefe
| 18749 Ayyubguliev ||  ||  || April 9, 1999 || Anderson Mesa || LONEOS || FLO || align=right | 1.6 km || 
|-id=750 bgcolor=#E9E9E9
| 18750 Leonidakimov ||  ||  || April 10, 1999 || Anderson Mesa || LONEOS || — || align=right | 4.2 km || 
|-id=751 bgcolor=#fefefe
| 18751 Yualexandrov ||  ||  || April 15, 1999 || Anderson Mesa || LONEOS || — || align=right | 3.1 km || 
|-id=752 bgcolor=#fefefe
| 18752 ||  || — || April 15, 1999 || Socorro || LINEAR || FLO || align=right | 2.2 km || 
|-id=753 bgcolor=#E9E9E9
| 18753 ||  || — || April 15, 1999 || Socorro || LINEAR || CLO || align=right | 10 km || 
|-id=754 bgcolor=#fefefe
| 18754 ||  || — || April 15, 1999 || Socorro || LINEAR || V || align=right | 4.4 km || 
|-id=755 bgcolor=#fefefe
| 18755 Meduna ||  ||  || April 15, 1999 || Socorro || LINEAR || V || align=right | 2.2 km || 
|-id=756 bgcolor=#fefefe
| 18756 ||  || — || April 6, 1999 || Socorro || LINEAR || — || align=right | 2.7 km || 
|-id=757 bgcolor=#fefefe
| 18757 || 1999 HT || — || April 18, 1999 || Woomera || F. B. Zoltowski || NYS || align=right | 3.0 km || 
|-id=758 bgcolor=#fefefe
| 18758 ||  || — || April 19, 1999 || Višnjan Observatory || K. Korlević, M. Jurić || FLO || align=right | 2.6 km || 
|-id=759 bgcolor=#fefefe
| 18759 ||  || — || April 20, 1999 || Valinhos || P. R. Holvorcem || ERI || align=right | 2.9 km || 
|-id=760 bgcolor=#fefefe
| 18760 ||  || — || April 19, 1999 || Kitt Peak || Spacewatch || MAS || align=right | 3.1 km || 
|-id=761 bgcolor=#fefefe
| 18761 ||  || — || April 20, 1999 || Kitt Peak || Spacewatch || — || align=right | 6.5 km || 
|-id=762 bgcolor=#fefefe
| 18762 ||  || — || April 17, 1999 || Socorro || LINEAR || — || align=right | 2.0 km || 
|-id=763 bgcolor=#E9E9E9
| 18763 ||  || — || May 8, 1999 || Xinglong || SCAP || — || align=right | 3.7 km || 
|-id=764 bgcolor=#fefefe
| 18764 ||  || — || May 13, 1999 || Socorro || LINEAR || PHO || align=right | 4.0 km || 
|-id=765 bgcolor=#fefefe
| 18765 ||  || — || May 14, 1999 || Socorro || LINEAR || — || align=right | 3.5 km || 
|-id=766 bgcolor=#E9E9E9
| 18766 Broderick ||  ||  || May 10, 1999 || Socorro || LINEAR || — || align=right | 3.5 km || 
|-id=767 bgcolor=#fefefe
| 18767 ||  || — || May 10, 1999 || Socorro || LINEAR || — || align=right | 3.3 km || 
|-id=768 bgcolor=#fefefe
| 18768 Sarahbates ||  ||  || May 10, 1999 || Socorro || LINEAR || FLO || align=right | 2.2 km || 
|-id=769 bgcolor=#d6d6d6
| 18769 ||  || — || May 10, 1999 || Socorro || LINEAR || JLI || align=right | 10 km || 
|-id=770 bgcolor=#fefefe
| 18770 Yingqiuqilei ||  ||  || May 10, 1999 || Socorro || LINEAR || — || align=right | 3.6 km || 
|-id=771 bgcolor=#fefefe
| 18771 Sisiliang ||  ||  || May 10, 1999 || Socorro || LINEAR || NYS || align=right | 5.7 km || 
|-id=772 bgcolor=#fefefe
| 18772 ||  || — || May 10, 1999 || Socorro || LINEAR || — || align=right | 3.3 km || 
|-id=773 bgcolor=#fefefe
| 18773 Bredehoft ||  ||  || May 10, 1999 || Socorro || LINEAR || — || align=right | 3.7 km || 
|-id=774 bgcolor=#fefefe
| 18774 Lavanture ||  ||  || May 10, 1999 || Socorro || LINEAR || NYS || align=right | 7.7 km || 
|-id=775 bgcolor=#fefefe
| 18775 Donaldeng ||  ||  || May 10, 1999 || Socorro || LINEAR || — || align=right | 3.3 km || 
|-id=776 bgcolor=#fefefe
| 18776 Coulter ||  ||  || May 10, 1999 || Socorro || LINEAR || — || align=right | 3.3 km || 
|-id=777 bgcolor=#E9E9E9
| 18777 Hobson ||  ||  || May 10, 1999 || Socorro || LINEAR || — || align=right | 3.0 km || 
|-id=778 bgcolor=#d6d6d6
| 18778 ||  || — || May 10, 1999 || Socorro || LINEAR || EOS || align=right | 12 km || 
|-id=779 bgcolor=#fefefe
| 18779 Hattyhong ||  ||  || May 10, 1999 || Socorro || LINEAR || V || align=right | 3.5 km || 
|-id=780 bgcolor=#fefefe
| 18780 Kuncham ||  ||  || May 10, 1999 || Socorro || LINEAR || — || align=right | 3.0 km || 
|-id=781 bgcolor=#fefefe
| 18781 Indaram ||  ||  || May 10, 1999 || Socorro || LINEAR || NYS || align=right | 3.3 km || 
|-id=782 bgcolor=#fefefe
| 18782 Joanrho ||  ||  || May 10, 1999 || Socorro || LINEAR || — || align=right | 2.1 km || 
|-id=783 bgcolor=#E9E9E9
| 18783 Sychamberlin ||  ||  || May 10, 1999 || Socorro || LINEAR || — || align=right | 2.9 km || 
|-id=784 bgcolor=#fefefe
| 18784 ||  || — || May 10, 1999 || Socorro || LINEAR || NYS || align=right | 2.1 km || 
|-id=785 bgcolor=#fefefe
| 18785 Betsywelsh ||  ||  || May 10, 1999 || Socorro || LINEAR || FLO || align=right | 4.4 km || 
|-id=786 bgcolor=#E9E9E9
| 18786 Tyjorgenson ||  ||  || May 10, 1999 || Socorro || LINEAR || — || align=right | 3.7 km || 
|-id=787 bgcolor=#fefefe
| 18787 Kathermann ||  ||  || May 10, 1999 || Socorro || LINEAR || — || align=right | 2.8 km || 
|-id=788 bgcolor=#fefefe
| 18788 Carriemiller ||  ||  || May 10, 1999 || Socorro || LINEAR || — || align=right | 2.7 km || 
|-id=789 bgcolor=#fefefe
| 18789 Metzger ||  ||  || May 10, 1999 || Socorro || LINEAR || — || align=right | 2.5 km || 
|-id=790 bgcolor=#E9E9E9
| 18790 Ericaburden ||  ||  || May 10, 1999 || Socorro || LINEAR || — || align=right | 3.6 km || 
|-id=791 bgcolor=#fefefe
| 18791 ||  || — || May 10, 1999 || Socorro || LINEAR || — || align=right | 4.0 km || 
|-id=792 bgcolor=#E9E9E9
| 18792 ||  || — || May 10, 1999 || Socorro || LINEAR || EUN || align=right | 5.5 km || 
|-id=793 bgcolor=#d6d6d6
| 18793 ||  || — || May 10, 1999 || Socorro || LINEAR || — || align=right | 7.3 km || 
|-id=794 bgcolor=#fefefe
| 18794 Kianafrank ||  ||  || May 10, 1999 || Socorro || LINEAR || — || align=right | 4.3 km || 
|-id=795 bgcolor=#fefefe
| 18795 ||  || — || May 10, 1999 || Socorro || LINEAR || — || align=right | 3.9 km || 
|-id=796 bgcolor=#fefefe
| 18796 Acosta ||  ||  || May 10, 1999 || Socorro || LINEAR || — || align=right | 3.8 km || 
|-id=797 bgcolor=#E9E9E9
| 18797 ||  || — || May 10, 1999 || Socorro || LINEAR || — || align=right | 3.3 km || 
|-id=798 bgcolor=#E9E9E9
| 18798 ||  || — || May 12, 1999 || Socorro || LINEAR || — || align=right | 4.8 km || 
|-id=799 bgcolor=#E9E9E9
| 18799 ||  || — || May 12, 1999 || Socorro || LINEAR || CLO || align=right | 8.7 km || 
|-id=800 bgcolor=#E9E9E9
| 18800 Terresadodge ||  ||  || May 10, 1999 || Socorro || LINEAR || — || align=right | 4.4 km || 
|}

18801–18900 

|-bgcolor=#fefefe
| 18801 Noelleoas ||  ||  || May 10, 1999 || Socorro || LINEAR || — || align=right | 3.6 km || 
|-id=802 bgcolor=#E9E9E9
| 18802 ||  || — || May 10, 1999 || Socorro || LINEAR || EUN || align=right | 3.9 km || 
|-id=803 bgcolor=#fefefe
| 18803 Hillaryoas ||  ||  || May 12, 1999 || Socorro || LINEAR || FLO || align=right | 3.9 km || 
|-id=804 bgcolor=#fefefe
| 18804 ||  || — || May 12, 1999 || Socorro || LINEAR || — || align=right | 5.6 km || 
|-id=805 bgcolor=#fefefe
| 18805 Kellyday ||  ||  || May 12, 1999 || Socorro || LINEAR || — || align=right | 4.0 km || 
|-id=806 bgcolor=#E9E9E9
| 18806 Zachpenn ||  ||  || May 13, 1999 || Socorro || LINEAR || MRX || align=right | 3.7 km || 
|-id=807 bgcolor=#fefefe
| 18807 ||  || — || May 14, 1999 || Socorro || LINEAR || — || align=right | 7.8 km || 
|-id=808 bgcolor=#E9E9E9
| 18808 ||  || — || May 15, 1999 || Socorro || LINEAR || — || align=right | 4.3 km || 
|-id=809 bgcolor=#fefefe
| 18809 Meileawertz ||  ||  || May 12, 1999 || Socorro || LINEAR || MAS || align=right | 1.9 km || 
|-id=810 bgcolor=#E9E9E9
| 18810 ||  || — || May 12, 1999 || Socorro || LINEAR || EUN || align=right | 5.1 km || 
|-id=811 bgcolor=#E9E9E9
| 18811 ||  || — || May 18, 1999 || Višnjan Observatory || K. Korlević || — || align=right | 10 km || 
|-id=812 bgcolor=#fefefe
| 18812 Aliadler ||  ||  || May 18, 1999 || Socorro || LINEAR || V || align=right | 4.5 km || 
|-id=813 bgcolor=#E9E9E9
| 18813 ||  || — || May 20, 1999 || Socorro || LINEAR || EUN || align=right | 7.6 km || 
|-id=814 bgcolor=#fefefe
| 18814 Ivanovsky ||  ||  || May 20, 1999 || Anderson Mesa || LONEOS || FLO || align=right | 2.9 km || 
|-id=815 bgcolor=#d6d6d6
| 18815 ||  || — || June 8, 1999 || Socorro || LINEAR || — || align=right | 12 km || 
|-id=816 bgcolor=#E9E9E9
| 18816 ||  || — || June 9, 1999 || Socorro || LINEAR || — || align=right | 5.3 km || 
|-id=817 bgcolor=#fefefe
| 18817 ||  || — || June 15, 1999 || Kitt Peak || Spacewatch || NYS || align=right | 2.6 km || 
|-id=818 bgcolor=#fefefe
| 18818 Yasuhiko ||  ||  || June 21, 1999 || Nanyo || T. Okuni || FLO || align=right | 4.9 km || 
|-id=819 bgcolor=#E9E9E9
| 18819 ||  || — || July 13, 1999 || Socorro || LINEAR || — || align=right | 4.6 km || 
|-id=820 bgcolor=#E9E9E9
| 18820 ||  || — || July 13, 1999 || Socorro || LINEAR || GEF || align=right | 6.9 km || 
|-id=821 bgcolor=#d6d6d6
| 18821 Markhavel ||  ||  || July 13, 1999 || Socorro || LINEAR || KOR || align=right | 5.7 km || 
|-id=822 bgcolor=#d6d6d6
| 18822 ||  || — || July 14, 1999 || Socorro || LINEAR || EOS || align=right | 5.4 km || 
|-id=823 bgcolor=#fefefe
| 18823 Zachozer ||  ||  || July 14, 1999 || Socorro || LINEAR || NYS || align=right | 3.4 km || 
|-id=824 bgcolor=#fefefe
| 18824 Graves ||  ||  || July 14, 1999 || Socorro || LINEAR || NYS || align=right | 2.5 km || 
|-id=825 bgcolor=#E9E9E9
| 18825 Alicechai ||  ||  || July 14, 1999 || Socorro || LINEAR || — || align=right | 5.7 km || 
|-id=826 bgcolor=#fefefe
| 18826 Leifer ||  ||  || July 14, 1999 || Socorro || LINEAR || NYS || align=right | 3.0 km || 
|-id=827 bgcolor=#d6d6d6
| 18827 ||  || — || July 14, 1999 || Socorro || LINEAR || — || align=right | 21 km || 
|-id=828 bgcolor=#d6d6d6
| 18828 ||  || — || July 14, 1999 || Socorro || LINEAR || THM || align=right | 13 km || 
|-id=829 bgcolor=#E9E9E9
| 18829 ||  || — || July 14, 1999 || Socorro || LINEAR || GEF || align=right | 5.9 km || 
|-id=830 bgcolor=#fefefe
| 18830 Pothier ||  ||  || July 14, 1999 || Socorro || LINEAR || — || align=right | 3.7 km || 
|-id=831 bgcolor=#d6d6d6
| 18831 ||  || — || July 14, 1999 || Socorro || LINEAR || EOS || align=right | 8.7 km || 
|-id=832 bgcolor=#d6d6d6
| 18832 ||  || — || July 14, 1999 || Socorro || LINEAR || — || align=right | 5.0 km || 
|-id=833 bgcolor=#E9E9E9
| 18833 ||  || — || July 12, 1999 || Socorro || LINEAR || ADE || align=right | 11 km || 
|-id=834 bgcolor=#E9E9E9
| 18834 ||  || — || July 12, 1999 || Socorro || LINEAR || — || align=right | 4.2 km || 
|-id=835 bgcolor=#E9E9E9
| 18835 ||  || — || July 12, 1999 || Socorro || LINEAR || EUN || align=right | 8.5 km || 
|-id=836 bgcolor=#fefefe
| 18836 Raymundto ||  ||  || July 13, 1999 || Socorro || LINEAR || FLO || align=right | 2.4 km || 
|-id=837 bgcolor=#fefefe
| 18837 ||  || — || July 13, 1999 || Socorro || LINEAR || — || align=right | 4.8 km || 
|-id=838 bgcolor=#d6d6d6
| 18838 Shannon || 1999 OQ ||  || July 18, 1999 || Ondřejov || L. Kotková, P. Kušnirák || KOR || align=right | 4.5 km || 
|-id=839 bgcolor=#d6d6d6
| 18839 Whiteley || 1999 PG ||  || August 5, 1999 || Reedy Creek || J. Broughton || EOS || align=right | 7.5 km || 
|-id=840 bgcolor=#fefefe
| 18840 Yoshioba ||  ||  || August 8, 1999 || Nanyo || T. Okuni || — || align=right | 5.3 km || 
|-id=841 bgcolor=#E9E9E9
| 18841 Hruška ||  ||  || September 6, 1999 || Kleť || J. Tichá, M. Tichý || MAR || align=right | 7.3 km || 
|-id=842 bgcolor=#E9E9E9
| 18842 ||  || — || September 7, 1999 || Socorro || LINEAR || — || align=right | 8.4 km || 
|-id=843 bgcolor=#d6d6d6
| 18843 Ningzhou ||  ||  || September 7, 1999 || Socorro || LINEAR || — || align=right | 7.8 km || 
|-id=844 bgcolor=#d6d6d6
| 18844 ||  || — || September 8, 1999 || Višnjan Observatory || K. Korlević || — || align=right | 12 km || 
|-id=845 bgcolor=#E9E9E9
| 18845 Cichocki ||  ||  || September 7, 1999 || Črni Vrh || H. Mikuž || EUN || align=right | 6.7 km || 
|-id=846 bgcolor=#E9E9E9
| 18846 ||  || — || September 8, 1999 || Kleť || Kleť Obs. || — || align=right | 5.6 km || 
|-id=847 bgcolor=#d6d6d6
| 18847 ||  || — || September 9, 1999 || Višnjan Observatory || K. Korlević || — || align=right | 14 km || 
|-id=848 bgcolor=#E9E9E9
| 18848 ||  || — || September 13, 1999 || Socorro || LINEAR || — || align=right | 17 km || 
|-id=849 bgcolor=#d6d6d6
| 18849 ||  || — || September 7, 1999 || Socorro || LINEAR || — || align=right | 9.6 km || 
|-id=850 bgcolor=#d6d6d6
| 18850 ||  || — || September 7, 1999 || Socorro || LINEAR || — || align=right | 13 km || 
|-id=851 bgcolor=#fefefe
| 18851 Winmesser ||  ||  || September 7, 1999 || Socorro || LINEAR || ERI || align=right | 7.6 km || 
|-id=852 bgcolor=#d6d6d6
| 18852 ||  || — || September 7, 1999 || Socorro || LINEAR || THM || align=right | 12 km || 
|-id=853 bgcolor=#d6d6d6
| 18853 ||  || — || September 7, 1999 || Socorro || LINEAR || ANF || align=right | 5.3 km || 
|-id=854 bgcolor=#d6d6d6
| 18854 ||  || — || September 8, 1999 || Socorro || LINEAR || — || align=right | 4.9 km || 
|-id=855 bgcolor=#fefefe
| 18855 Sarahgutman ||  ||  || September 9, 1999 || Socorro || LINEAR || — || align=right | 3.5 km || 
|-id=856 bgcolor=#E9E9E9
| 18856 ||  || — || September 9, 1999 || Socorro || LINEAR || — || align=right | 5.2 km || 
|-id=857 bgcolor=#fefefe
| 18857 Lalchandani ||  ||  || September 9, 1999 || Socorro || LINEAR || V || align=right | 3.0 km || 
|-id=858 bgcolor=#E9E9E9
| 18858 Tecleveland ||  ||  || September 9, 1999 || Socorro || LINEAR || — || align=right | 5.6 km || 
|-id=859 bgcolor=#d6d6d6
| 18859 ||  || — || September 9, 1999 || Socorro || LINEAR || — || align=right | 11 km || 
|-id=860 bgcolor=#d6d6d6
| 18860 ||  || — || September 9, 1999 || Socorro || LINEAR || — || align=right | 15 km || 
|-id=861 bgcolor=#E9E9E9
| 18861 Eugenishmidt ||  ||  || September 9, 1999 || Socorro || LINEAR || — || align=right | 3.7 km || 
|-id=862 bgcolor=#fefefe
| 18862 Warot ||  ||  || September 9, 1999 || Socorro || LINEAR || — || align=right | 3.0 km || 
|-id=863 bgcolor=#E9E9E9
| 18863 ||  || — || September 11, 1999 || Socorro || LINEAR || EUN || align=right | 7.6 km || 
|-id=864 bgcolor=#d6d6d6
| 18864 ||  || — || September 8, 1999 || Socorro || LINEAR || URS || align=right | 7.1 km || 
|-id=865 bgcolor=#d6d6d6
| 18865 ||  || — || September 8, 1999 || Socorro || LINEAR || — || align=right | 9.4 km || 
|-id=866 bgcolor=#fefefe
| 18866 ||  || — || September 8, 1999 || Socorro || LINEAR || — || align=right | 4.5 km || 
|-id=867 bgcolor=#E9E9E9
| 18867 ||  || — || September 7, 1999 || Catalina || CSS || — || align=right | 5.5 km || 
|-id=868 bgcolor=#d6d6d6
| 18868 ||  || — || October 2, 1999 || Socorro || LINEAR || — || align=right | 8.9 km || 
|-id=869 bgcolor=#d6d6d6
| 18869 ||  || — || October 2, 1999 || Socorro || LINEAR || — || align=right | 7.2 km || 
|-id=870 bgcolor=#E9E9E9
| 18870 ||  || — || October 29, 1999 || Catalina || CSS || — || align=right | 4.5 km || 
|-id=871 bgcolor=#E9E9E9
| 18871 Grauer ||  ||  || November 11, 1999 || Fountain Hills || C. W. Juels || EUN || align=right | 7.9 km || 
|-id=872 bgcolor=#E9E9E9
| 18872 Tammann ||  ||  || November 8, 1999 || Gnosca || S. Sposetti || MAR || align=right | 5.5 km || 
|-id=873 bgcolor=#fefefe
| 18873 Larryrobinson ||  ||  || November 13, 1999 || EverStaR || M. Abraham, G. Fedon || — || align=right | 3.5 km || 
|-id=874 bgcolor=#fefefe
| 18874 Raoulbehrend ||  ||  || November 8, 1999 || Gnosca || S. Sposetti || — || align=right | 2.9 km || 
|-id=875 bgcolor=#d6d6d6
| 18875 ||  || — || November 11, 1999 || Kitt Peak || Spacewatch || — || align=right | 10 km || 
|-id=876 bgcolor=#fefefe
| 18876 Sooner || 1999 XM ||  || December 2, 1999 || Oaxaca || J. M. Roe || — || align=right | 3.1 km || 
|-id=877 bgcolor=#E9E9E9
| 18877 Stevendodds ||  ||  || December 4, 1999 || Fountain Hills || C. W. Juels || — || align=right | 5.0 km || 
|-id=878 bgcolor=#fefefe
| 18878 ||  || — || December 5, 1999 || Catalina || CSS || — || align=right | 3.8 km || 
|-id=879 bgcolor=#E9E9E9
| 18879 ||  || — || December 15, 1999 || Fountain Hills || C. W. Juels || — || align=right | 5.6 km || 
|-id=880 bgcolor=#d6d6d6
| 18880 Toddblumberg ||  ||  || December 10, 1999 || Socorro || LINEAR || — || align=right | 4.3 km || 
|-id=881 bgcolor=#E9E9E9
| 18881 ||  || — || December 12, 1999 || Socorro || LINEAR || MAR || align=right | 9.0 km || 
|-id=882 bgcolor=#FFC2E0
| 18882 ||  || — || December 28, 1999 || Socorro || LINEAR || AMO +1km || align=right | 2.2 km || 
|-id=883 bgcolor=#d6d6d6
| 18883 Domegge ||  ||  || December 31, 1999 || EverStaR || M. Abraham, G. Fedon || EOS || align=right | 4.4 km || 
|-id=884 bgcolor=#E9E9E9
| 18884 ||  || — || December 30, 1999 || Višnjan Observatory || K. Korlević || — || align=right | 5.9 km || 
|-id=885 bgcolor=#fefefe
| 18885 ||  || — || January 5, 2000 || Socorro || LINEAR || FLO || align=right | 2.6 km || 
|-id=886 bgcolor=#E9E9E9
| 18886 ||  || — || January 5, 2000 || Socorro || LINEAR || — || align=right | 5.7 km || 
|-id=887 bgcolor=#fefefe
| 18887 Yiliuchen ||  ||  || January 7, 2000 || Socorro || LINEAR || — || align=right | 3.5 km || 
|-id=888 bgcolor=#d6d6d6
| 18888 ||  || — || January 7, 2000 || Kitt Peak || Spacewatch || 2:1J || align=right | 11 km || 
|-id=889 bgcolor=#E9E9E9
| 18889 ||  || — || February 8, 2000 || Socorro || LINEAR || ADE || align=right | 13 km || 
|-id=890 bgcolor=#fefefe
| 18890 ||  || — || March 9, 2000 || Socorro || LINEAR || Hmoon || align=right | 2.1 km || 
|-id=891 bgcolor=#fefefe
| 18891 Kamler ||  ||  || March 8, 2000 || Socorro || LINEAR || — || align=right | 4.6 km || 
|-id=892 bgcolor=#E9E9E9
| 18892 ||  || — || March 9, 2000 || Socorro || LINEAR || ADEslow || align=right | 8.2 km || 
|-id=893 bgcolor=#d6d6d6
| 18893 ||  || — || April 2, 2000 || Starkenburg Observatory || Starkenburg Obs. || URS || align=right | 9.0 km || 
|-id=894 bgcolor=#d6d6d6
| 18894 ||  || — || April 5, 2000 || Socorro || LINEAR || HYG || align=right | 7.7 km || 
|-id=895 bgcolor=#d6d6d6
| 18895 ||  || — || April 7, 2000 || Socorro || LINEAR || — || align=right | 22 km || 
|-id=896 bgcolor=#fefefe
| 18896 ||  || — || April 6, 2000 || Socorro || LINEAR || — || align=right | 6.4 km || 
|-id=897 bgcolor=#E9E9E9
| 18897 ||  || — || April 28, 2000 || Socorro || LINEAR || — || align=right | 9.2 km || 
|-id=898 bgcolor=#d6d6d6
| 18898 || 2000 JX || — || May 1, 2000 || Socorro || LINEAR || EUP || align=right | 14 km || 
|-id=899 bgcolor=#FA8072
| 18899 ||  || — || May 3, 2000 || Višnjan Observatory || K. Korlević || slow || align=right | 2.1 km || 
|-id=900 bgcolor=#d6d6d6
| 18900 ||  || — || June 4, 2000 || Socorro || LINEAR || TIR || align=right | 7.8 km || 
|}

18901–19000 

|-bgcolor=#d6d6d6
| 18901 ||  || — || June 24, 2000 || Socorro || LINEAR || ALA || align=right | 13 km || 
|-id=902 bgcolor=#E9E9E9
| 18902 ||  || — || July 7, 2000 || Socorro || LINEAR || GEF || align=right | 5.8 km || 
|-id=903 bgcolor=#E9E9E9
| 18903 Matsuura ||  ||  || July 10, 2000 || JCPM Sapporo || K. Watanabe || — || align=right | 5.7 km || 
|-id=904 bgcolor=#fefefe
| 18904 ||  || — || July 31, 2000 || Socorro || LINEAR || NYS || align=right | 3.1 km || 
|-id=905 bgcolor=#fefefe
| 18905 Weigan ||  ||  || July 23, 2000 || Socorro || LINEAR || — || align=right | 2.5 km || 
|-id=906 bgcolor=#fefefe
| 18906 ||  || — || July 29, 2000 || Socorro || LINEAR || — || align=right | 3.6 km || 
|-id=907 bgcolor=#fefefe
| 18907 Kevinclaytor ||  ||  || July 31, 2000 || Socorro || LINEAR || V || align=right | 3.0 km || 
|-id=908 bgcolor=#fefefe
| 18908 ||  || — || July 31, 2000 || Socorro || LINEAR || NYS || align=right | 5.8 km || 
|-id=909 bgcolor=#d6d6d6
| 18909 ||  || — || July 31, 2000 || Socorro || LINEAR || — || align=right | 10 km || 
|-id=910 bgcolor=#fefefe
| 18910 Nolanreis ||  ||  || July 31, 2000 || Socorro || LINEAR || — || align=right | 3.4 km || 
|-id=911 bgcolor=#d6d6d6
| 18911 ||  || — || July 30, 2000 || Socorro || LINEAR || — || align=right | 12 km || 
|-id=912 bgcolor=#E9E9E9
| 18912 Kayfurman ||  ||  || July 30, 2000 || Socorro || LINEAR || GEF || align=right | 4.2 km || 
|-id=913 bgcolor=#E9E9E9
| 18913 ||  || — || July 30, 2000 || Socorro || LINEAR || — || align=right | 5.1 km || 
|-id=914 bgcolor=#E9E9E9
| 18914 ||  || — || July 31, 2000 || Socorro || LINEAR || — || align=right | 3.9 km || 
|-id=915 bgcolor=#d6d6d6
| 18915 ||  || — || July 30, 2000 || Socorro || LINEAR || — || align=right | 7.9 km || 
|-id=916 bgcolor=#B88A00
| 18916 ||  || — || July 30, 2000 || Socorro || LINEAR || unusual || align=right | 5.6 km || 
|-id=917 bgcolor=#fefefe
| 18917 ||  || — || July 31, 2000 || Socorro || LINEAR || — || align=right | 6.1 km || 
|-id=918 bgcolor=#fefefe
| 18918 Nishashah ||  ||  || July 31, 2000 || Socorro || LINEAR || FLO || align=right | 3.9 km || 
|-id=919 bgcolor=#FA8072
| 18919 ||  || — || July 31, 2000 || Socorro || LINEAR || — || align=right | 2.7 km || 
|-id=920 bgcolor=#fefefe
| 18920 ||  || — || July 31, 2000 || Socorro || LINEAR || — || align=right | 3.7 km || 
|-id=921 bgcolor=#d6d6d6
| 18921 ||  || — || August 2, 2000 || Socorro || LINEAR || EOS || align=right | 8.6 km || 
|-id=922 bgcolor=#E9E9E9
| 18922 ||  || — || August 8, 2000 || Socorro || LINEAR || EUN || align=right | 7.3 km || 
|-id=923 bgcolor=#fefefe
| 18923 Jennifersass ||  ||  || August 2, 2000 || Socorro || LINEAR || — || align=right | 2.6 km || 
|-id=924 bgcolor=#fefefe
| 18924 Vinjamoori ||  ||  || August 3, 2000 || Socorro || LINEAR || V || align=right | 2.5 km || 
|-id=925 bgcolor=#E9E9E9
| 18925 ||  || — || August 4, 2000 || Haleakala || NEAT || — || align=right | 11 km || 
|-id=926 bgcolor=#fefefe
| 18926 ||  || — || August 5, 2000 || Haleakala || NEAT || — || align=right | 2.3 km || 
|-id=927 bgcolor=#E9E9E9
| 18927 ||  || — || August 5, 2000 || Haleakala || NEAT || — || align=right | 10 km || 
|-id=928 bgcolor=#d6d6d6
| 18928 Pontremoli ||  ||  || August 25, 2000 || Monte Viseggi || Monte Viseggi Obs. || EOS || align=right | 6.4 km || 
|-id=929 bgcolor=#fefefe
| 18929 ||  || — || August 26, 2000 || Socorro || LINEAR || H || align=right | 1.6 km || 
|-id=930 bgcolor=#d6d6d6
| 18930 Athreya ||  ||  || August 24, 2000 || Socorro || LINEAR || KOR || align=right | 3.9 km || 
|-id=931 bgcolor=#d6d6d6
| 18931 ||  || — || August 26, 2000 || Socorro || LINEAR || — || align=right | 7.7 km || 
|-id=932 bgcolor=#fefefe
| 18932 Robinhood ||  ||  || August 28, 2000 || Reedy Creek || J. Broughton || NYS || align=right | 3.8 km || 
|-id=933 bgcolor=#fefefe
| 18933 ||  || — || August 24, 2000 || Socorro || LINEAR || NYS || align=right | 2.2 km || 
|-id=934 bgcolor=#d6d6d6
| 18934 ||  || — || August 24, 2000 || Socorro || LINEAR || — || align=right | 9.2 km || 
|-id=935 bgcolor=#fefefe
| 18935 Alfandmedina ||  ||  || August 24, 2000 || Socorro || LINEAR || — || align=right | 2.2 km || 
|-id=936 bgcolor=#d6d6d6
| 18936 ||  || — || August 24, 2000 || Socorro || LINEAR || EOS || align=right | 8.5 km || 
|-id=937 bgcolor=#d6d6d6
| 18937 ||  || — || August 24, 2000 || Socorro || LINEAR || EOS || align=right | 5.9 km || 
|-id=938 bgcolor=#E9E9E9
| 18938 Zarabeth ||  ||  || August 24, 2000 || Socorro || LINEAR || — || align=right | 5.1 km || 
|-id=939 bgcolor=#d6d6d6
| 18939 Sariancel ||  ||  || August 24, 2000 || Socorro || LINEAR || THM || align=right | 11 km || 
|-id=940 bgcolor=#C2FFFF
| 18940 ||  || — || August 24, 2000 || Socorro || LINEAR || L5 || align=right | 21 km || 
|-id=941 bgcolor=#d6d6d6
| 18941 ||  || — || August 24, 2000 || Socorro || LINEAR || HYG || align=right | 11 km || 
|-id=942 bgcolor=#E9E9E9
| 18942 ||  || — || August 25, 2000 || Socorro || LINEAR || — || align=right | 8.9 km || 
|-id=943 bgcolor=#fefefe
| 18943 Elaisponton ||  ||  || August 25, 2000 || Socorro || LINEAR || V || align=right | 2.3 km || 
|-id=944 bgcolor=#d6d6d6
| 18944 Sawilliams ||  ||  || August 28, 2000 || Socorro || LINEAR || — || align=right | 8.5 km || 
|-id=945 bgcolor=#fefefe
| 18945 ||  || — || August 24, 2000 || Socorro || LINEAR || — || align=right | 3.2 km || 
|-id=946 bgcolor=#d6d6d6
| 18946 Massar ||  ||  || August 24, 2000 || Socorro || LINEAR || THM || align=right | 8.7 km || 
|-id=947 bgcolor=#fefefe
| 18947 Cindyfulton ||  ||  || August 24, 2000 || Socorro || LINEAR || NYS || align=right | 3.4 km || 
|-id=948 bgcolor=#E9E9E9
| 18948 Hinkle ||  ||  || August 24, 2000 || Socorro || LINEAR || — || align=right | 6.1 km || 
|-id=949 bgcolor=#fefefe
| 18949 Tumaneng ||  ||  || August 25, 2000 || Socorro || LINEAR || V || align=right | 1.9 km || 
|-id=950 bgcolor=#E9E9E9
| 18950 Marakessler ||  ||  || August 26, 2000 || Socorro || LINEAR || PAD || align=right | 4.8 km || 
|-id=951 bgcolor=#fefefe
| 18951 ||  || — || August 28, 2000 || Socorro || LINEAR || — || align=right | 3.3 km || 
|-id=952 bgcolor=#d6d6d6
| 18952 ||  || — || August 28, 2000 || Socorro || LINEAR || — || align=right | 13 km || 
|-id=953 bgcolor=#E9E9E9
| 18953 Laurensmith ||  ||  || August 24, 2000 || Socorro || LINEAR || HEN || align=right | 2.5 km || 
|-id=954 bgcolor=#fefefe
| 18954 Sarahbounds ||  ||  || August 25, 2000 || Socorro || LINEAR || FLO || align=right | 2.8 km || 
|-id=955 bgcolor=#d6d6d6
| 18955 ||  || — || August 25, 2000 || Socorro || LINEAR || — || align=right | 11 km || 
|-id=956 bgcolor=#fefefe
| 18956 Jessicarnold ||  ||  || August 31, 2000 || Socorro || LINEAR || — || align=right | 2.4 km || 
|-id=957 bgcolor=#fefefe
| 18957 Mijacobsen ||  ||  || August 24, 2000 || Socorro || LINEAR || — || align=right | 2.5 km || 
|-id=958 bgcolor=#d6d6d6
| 18958 ||  || — || August 24, 2000 || Socorro || LINEAR || 7:4 || align=right | 15 km || 
|-id=959 bgcolor=#d6d6d6
| 18959 ||  || — || August 31, 2000 || Socorro || LINEAR || SYL7:4 || align=right | 10 km || 
|-id=960 bgcolor=#fefefe
| 18960 ||  || — || August 31, 2000 || Socorro || LINEAR || FLO || align=right | 4.6 km || 
|-id=961 bgcolor=#fefefe
| 18961 Hampfreeman ||  ||  || August 31, 2000 || Socorro || LINEAR || NYS || align=right | 2.2 km || 
|-id=962 bgcolor=#fefefe
| 18962 ||  || — || August 31, 2000 || Socorro || LINEAR || — || align=right | 2.5 km || 
|-id=963 bgcolor=#E9E9E9
| 18963 ||  || — || August 31, 2000 || Socorro || LINEAR || DOR || align=right | 16 km || 
|-id=964 bgcolor=#fefefe
| 18964 Fairhurst ||  ||  || August 31, 2000 || Socorro || LINEAR || NYS || align=right | 3.2 km || 
|-id=965 bgcolor=#fefefe
| 18965 Lazenby ||  ||  || August 31, 2000 || Socorro || LINEAR || — || align=right | 2.1 km || 
|-id=966 bgcolor=#fefefe
| 18966 ||  || — || August 31, 2000 || Socorro || LINEAR || — || align=right | 1.5 km || 
|-id=967 bgcolor=#E9E9E9
| 18967 ||  || — || August 25, 2000 || Socorro || LINEAR || GEF || align=right | 5.9 km || 
|-id=968 bgcolor=#d6d6d6
| 18968 ||  || — || August 29, 2000 || Socorro || LINEAR || — || align=right | 5.7 km || 
|-id=969 bgcolor=#fefefe
| 18969 Valfriedmann ||  ||  || August 29, 2000 || Socorro || LINEAR || FLO || align=right | 2.0 km || 
|-id=970 bgcolor=#fefefe
| 18970 Jenniharper ||  ||  || August 31, 2000 || Socorro || LINEAR || — || align=right | 2.5 km || 
|-id=971 bgcolor=#C2FFFF
| 18971 ||  || — || August 31, 2000 || Socorro || LINEAR || L5 || align=right | 25 km || 
|-id=972 bgcolor=#d6d6d6
| 18972 ||  || — || August 26, 2000 || Socorro || LINEAR || — || align=right | 9.3 km || 
|-id=973 bgcolor=#E9E9E9
| 18973 Crouch ||  ||  || August 29, 2000 || Socorro || LINEAR || — || align=right | 6.9 km || 
|-id=974 bgcolor=#fefefe
| 18974 Brungardt ||  ||  || August 28, 2000 || Socorro || LINEAR || — || align=right | 3.6 km || 
|-id=975 bgcolor=#E9E9E9
| 18975 ||  || — || August 29, 2000 || Socorro || LINEAR || — || align=right | 5.3 km || 
|-id=976 bgcolor=#fefefe
| 18976 Kunilraval ||  ||  || August 31, 2000 || Socorro || LINEAR || FLO || align=right | 3.1 km || 
|-id=977 bgcolor=#E9E9E9
| 18977 ||  || — || August 31, 2000 || Socorro || LINEAR || — || align=right | 6.9 km || 
|-id=978 bgcolor=#E9E9E9
| 18978 ||  || — || August 31, 2000 || Socorro || LINEAR || — || align=right | 3.9 km || 
|-id=979 bgcolor=#E9E9E9
| 18979 Henryfong ||  ||  || September 1, 2000 || Socorro || LINEAR || — || align=right | 4.9 km || 
|-id=980 bgcolor=#fefefe
| 18980 Johannatang ||  ||  || September 1, 2000 || Socorro || LINEAR || — || align=right | 6.2 km || 
|-id=981 bgcolor=#E9E9E9
| 18981 ||  || — || September 1, 2000 || Socorro || LINEAR || — || align=right | 4.4 km || 
|-id=982 bgcolor=#fefefe
| 18982 ||  || — || September 1, 2000 || Socorro || LINEAR || NYS || align=right | 2.9 km || 
|-id=983 bgcolor=#fefefe
| 18983 Allentran ||  ||  || September 1, 2000 || Socorro || LINEAR || NYS || align=right | 7.1 km || 
|-id=984 bgcolor=#d6d6d6
| 18984 Olathe ||  ||  || September 2, 2000 || Olathe || L. Robinson || — || align=right | 18 km || 
|-id=985 bgcolor=#fefefe
| 18985 ||  || — || September 1, 2000 || Socorro || LINEAR || — || align=right | 2.6 km || 
|-id=986 bgcolor=#E9E9E9
| 18986 ||  || — || September 1, 2000 || Socorro || LINEAR || — || align=right | 11 km || 
|-id=987 bgcolor=#fefefe
| 18987 Irani ||  ||  || September 1, 2000 || Socorro || LINEAR || — || align=right | 3.6 km || 
|-id=988 bgcolor=#E9E9E9
| 18988 ||  || — || September 1, 2000 || Socorro || LINEAR || EUN || align=right | 4.9 km || 
|-id=989 bgcolor=#d6d6d6
| 18989 ||  || — || September 1, 2000 || Socorro || LINEAR || — || align=right | 6.7 km || 
|-id=990 bgcolor=#d6d6d6
| 18990 ||  || — || September 1, 2000 || Socorro || LINEAR || EOS || align=right | 8.0 km || 
|-id=991 bgcolor=#fefefe
| 18991 Tonivanov ||  ||  || September 1, 2000 || Socorro || LINEAR || FLO || align=right | 2.6 km || 
|-id=992 bgcolor=#d6d6d6
| 18992 Katharvard ||  ||  || September 3, 2000 || Socorro || LINEAR || — || align=right | 7.3 km || 
|-id=993 bgcolor=#d6d6d6
| 18993 ||  || — || September 3, 2000 || Socorro || LINEAR || — || align=right | 7.4 km || 
|-id=994 bgcolor=#fefefe
| 18994 Nhannguyen ||  ||  || September 5, 2000 || Socorro || LINEAR || V || align=right | 3.0 km || 
|-id=995 bgcolor=#fefefe
| 18995 ||  || — || September 5, 2000 || Višnjan Observatory || K. Korlević || MAS || align=right | 2.5 km || 
|-id=996 bgcolor=#d6d6d6
| 18996 Torasan ||  ||  || September 4, 2000 || JCPM Sapporo || K. Watanabe || ALA || align=right | 23 km || 
|-id=997 bgcolor=#E9E9E9
| 18997 Mizrahi ||  ||  || September 1, 2000 || Socorro || LINEAR || — || align=right | 7.1 km || 
|-id=998 bgcolor=#fefefe
| 18998 ||  || — || September 3, 2000 || Socorro || LINEAR || — || align=right | 7.1 km || 
|-id=999 bgcolor=#E9E9E9
| 18999 ||  || — || September 8, 2000 || Višnjan Observatory || K. Korlević || HNA || align=right | 5.9 km || 
|-id=000 bgcolor=#E9E9E9
| 19000 ||  || — || September 3, 2000 || Socorro || LINEAR || GEF || align=right | 5.7 km || 
|}

References

External links 
 Discovery Circumstances: Numbered Minor Planets (15001)–(20000) (IAU Minor Planet Center)

0018